= Supply chain =

System involved in supplying a product or service to a consumer

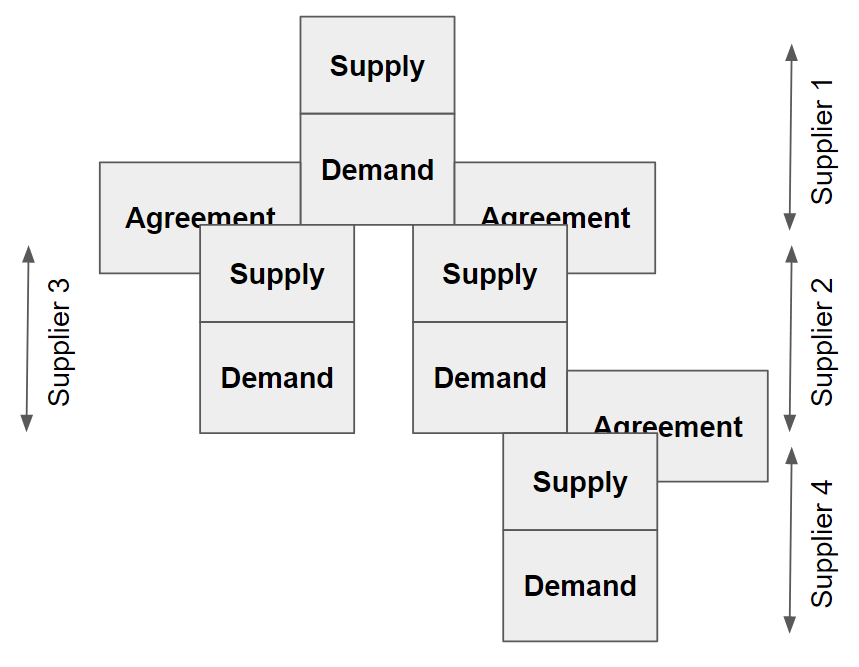
Supply and demand stacked in a conceptual chain

A supply chain is a complex logistics system that consists of facilities that convert raw materials into finished products and distribute them to end consumers or end customers, while supply chain management focuses on the optimization of the flow of goods within the supply chain's distribution channels to ensure efficiency.

In sophisticated supply chain systems, the reintroduction of used products into the supply chain may occur at any point where the residual value of the product is recyclable. Supply chains are linked to value chains, and suppliers within a supply chain are often organized into tiers. First-tier suppliers, also referred to as "direct suppliers", directly supply goods or services to the client. Second-tier suppliers supply to the first tier, and so on, creating a hierarchical structure within the supply network.

The phrase "supply chain" may have been first published in a 1905 article in The Independent, which briefly mentioned the difficulty of "keeping a supply chain with India unbroken" during the British expedition to Tibet.

== Overview ==
A chain is actually a complex and dynamic supply and demand network.

A typical supply chain can be divided into two stages namely, production and distribution stages. In the production stage, components and semi-finished parts are produced in manufacturing centres. The components are then put together in an assembly plant. The distribution stage consists of central and regional distribution centres that transport products to end-consumers. Mentzer et al. suggest that at least three entities are required for there to be a "supply chain".

At the end of the supply chain, materials and finished products only flow there because of the customer behaviour at the end of the chain; academics Alan Harrison and Janet Godsell argue that "supply chain processes should be coordinated in order to focus on end customer buying behaviour", and look for "customer responsiveness" as an indicator confirming that materials are able to flow "through a sequence of supply chain processes in order to meet end customer buying behaviour".

Many of the exchanges encountered in the supply chain take place between varied companies that seek to maximize their revenue within their sphere of interest but may have little or no knowledge or interest in the remaining players in the supply chain. More recently, the loosely coupled, self-organizing network of businesses who cooperate in providing product and service offerings has been called the extended enterprise, and the use of the term "chain" and the linear structure it appears to represent have been criticized as "harder to relate to the way supply networks really operate". A chain is actually a complex and dynamic supply and demand network.

Many large companies and global brands incorporate codes of conduct and guidelines into their corporate cultures and management systems to promote ethical practices. These guidelines may establish requirements for suppliers, including manufacturing facilities, farms and subcontracted service providers such as cleaning, catering and security companies. Companies may use social audits to assess supplier compliance with specified standards. Limited supply chain transparency can make it difficult for consumers to determine the origins of products and may allow socially irresponsible practices to go undetected. A 2018 survey by the Loyola University Chicago Supply and Value Chain Center found that 53% of supply chain professionals considered ethics to be "extremely" important to their organizations.

There can be numerous tiers within a supply chain. For example, Astrid Bosten (of the German chemical and consumer goods company, Henkel) suggests that there are typically nine tiers in a chemical industry supply chain when product development and manufacture are included. In some cases, the operation of multiple tiers within a supply chain may give rise to additional costs, due to the "profit layering", where each tier's operators add a profit margin to their costs. For example, in 2015 the UK's Ministry of Justice recognised that its lift maintenance and refurbishment contracts were let to a main contractor who then sub-contracted the work to a specialist lift contractor. The ministry avoided the cost impact of this arrangement by contracting for lift work directly with the specialist contractors.

== Typologies ==
Marshall L. Fisher (1997) asks the question in a key article, "Which is the right supply chain for your product?" Fisher, and also Naylor, Naim and Berry (1999), identify two matching characteristics of supply chain strategy: a combination of "functional" and "efficient", or a combination of "responsive" and "innovative" (Harrison and Godsell).

Mentzer et al. distinguish between "direct supply chains", "extended supply chains", and "ultimate supply chains"; in their usage:

- a "direct" supply chain involves a company, a supplier and a customer
- an "extended" supply chain includes suppliers of the immediate supplier and customers of the immediate customer
- an "ultimate" supply chain includes all of the organizations involved in the supply of the product or service.

In each case, the flow of information and finances is part of the chain as well as the product or service. Fazel Zarandi et al. add "buyer-seller relations" (at each stage), in addition to the flow of information, as the third main component of a supply chain. Mentzer et al. remind readers also that the focus of a supply chain is on the product or service in its end state: they refer to "the supply chain for candy" and "the supply chain for clothing". Individual supply chain actors may be positioned at different points in different supply chains: a bank, for example, may play a supporting role in certain supply chains, but acts as either the customer or the nearest supplier to the customer in the supply chain for security printing.

Brown et al. refer to supply chains as either "loosely coupled" or "tightly coupled":

Cutting-edge companies are swapping their tightly coupled processes for loosely coupled ones, making themselves not only more flexible but also more profitable.

These ideas refer to two polar models of collaboration: tightly coupled, or "hard-wired", also known as "linked", collaboration represents a close relationship between a buyer and supplier within the chain, whereas a loosely-coupled link relates to low interdependency between buyer and seller and therefore greater flexibility. The Chartered Institute of Procurement & Supply's professional guidance suggests that the aim of a tightly coupled relationship is to reduce inventory and avoid stock-outs.

== Modeling and mapping ==
A diagram of a supply chain. The black arrow represents the flow of materials and information, and the gray arrow represents the flow of information and backhauls. The elements are (a) the initial supplier (vendor or plant), (b) a supplier, (c) a manufacturer (production), (d) a customer, and (e) the final customer.

There are a variety of supply-chain models, which address both the upstream and downstream elements of supply-chain management (SCM). The SCOR (Supply-Chain Operations Reference) model, developed by a consortium of industry and the non-profit Supply Chain Council (now part of APICS) became the cross-industry de facto standard defining the scope of supply-chain management. SCOR measures total supply-chain performance. It is a process reference model for supply-chain management, extending "from the supplier's supplier to the customer's customer". It includes delivery and order fulfillment performance, production flexibility, warranty and returns processing costs, inventory and asset turns, and other factors in evaluating the overall effective performance of a supply chain.

A supply chain can often be split into different segments: the earlier stages of a supply chain, such as raw material processing and manufacturing, determine their break-even point by considering production costs relative to market price. The later stages of a supply chain, such as wholesale and retail determine their break-even point by considering transaction costs, relative to market price. Additionally, there are financial costs associated with all the stages of a supply chain model.

The Global Supply Chain Forum has proposed an alternative model for understanding supply chain management. The framework identifies eight key business processes that operate across different business functions and organisations. Each process is managed by a cross-functional team with representatives from areas such as logistics, production, purchasing, finance, marketing, and research and development. The processes involve coordination with key customers and suppliers. Within the framework, customer relationship management and supplier relationship management play an important role in connecting the different participants across the supply chain.

The American Productivity and Quality Center (APQC) Process Classification Framework (PCF) SM is a high-level, industry-neutral enterprise process model that allows organizations to view their business processes from a cross-industry perspective. The PCF was developed by APQC and its member organizations as an open standard to facilitate improvement through process management and benchmarking, regardless of industry, size, or geography. The PCF organizes operating and management processes into 12 enterprise-level categories, including process groups, and over 1,000 processes and associated activities.

In the developing country public health setting, John Snow, Inc. has developed the JSI Framework for Integrated Supply Chain Management in Public Health, which draws from commercial sector best practices to solve problems in public health supply chains.

Similarly, supply chain mapping involves documenting information regarding all participants in an organization's supply chain and assembling the information as a global map of the organization's supply network.

== Management ==
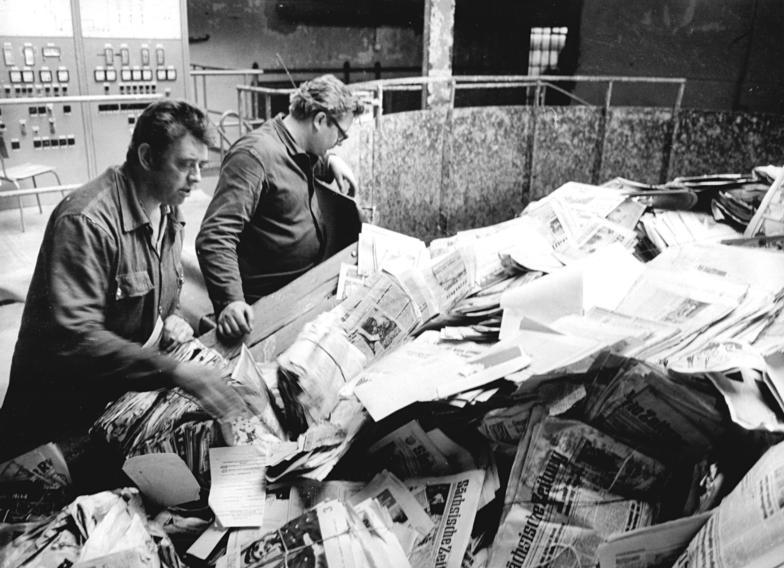
A German paper factory receives its daily supply of 75 tons of recyclable paper as its raw material.

In the 1980s, the term supply-chain management (SCM) was developed to express the need to integrate the key business processes, from end user through original suppliers. Original suppliers are those that provide products, services, and information that add value for customers and other stakeholders. The basic idea behind SCM is that companies and corporations involve themselves in a supply chain by exchanging information about market demand, distribution capacity and production capabilities. Keith Oliver, a consultant at Booz Allen Hamilton, is credited with the term's invention after using it in an interview for the Financial Times in 1982. The term was used earlier by Alizamir et al. in 1981, and Burns and Sivazlian in 1978.

If all relevant information is accessible to any relevant company, every company in the supply chain has the ability to help optimize the entire supply chain rather than to sub-optimize based on local optimization. This will lead to better-planned overall production and distribution, which can cut costs and give a more attractive final product, leading to better sales and better overall results for the companies involved. This is one form of vertical integration. Yet, it has been shown that the motives for and performance efficacy of vertical integration differ by global region.

Incorporating SCM successfully leads to a new kind of competition on the global market, where competition is no longer of the company-versus-company form but rather takes on a supply-chain-versus-supply-chain form.

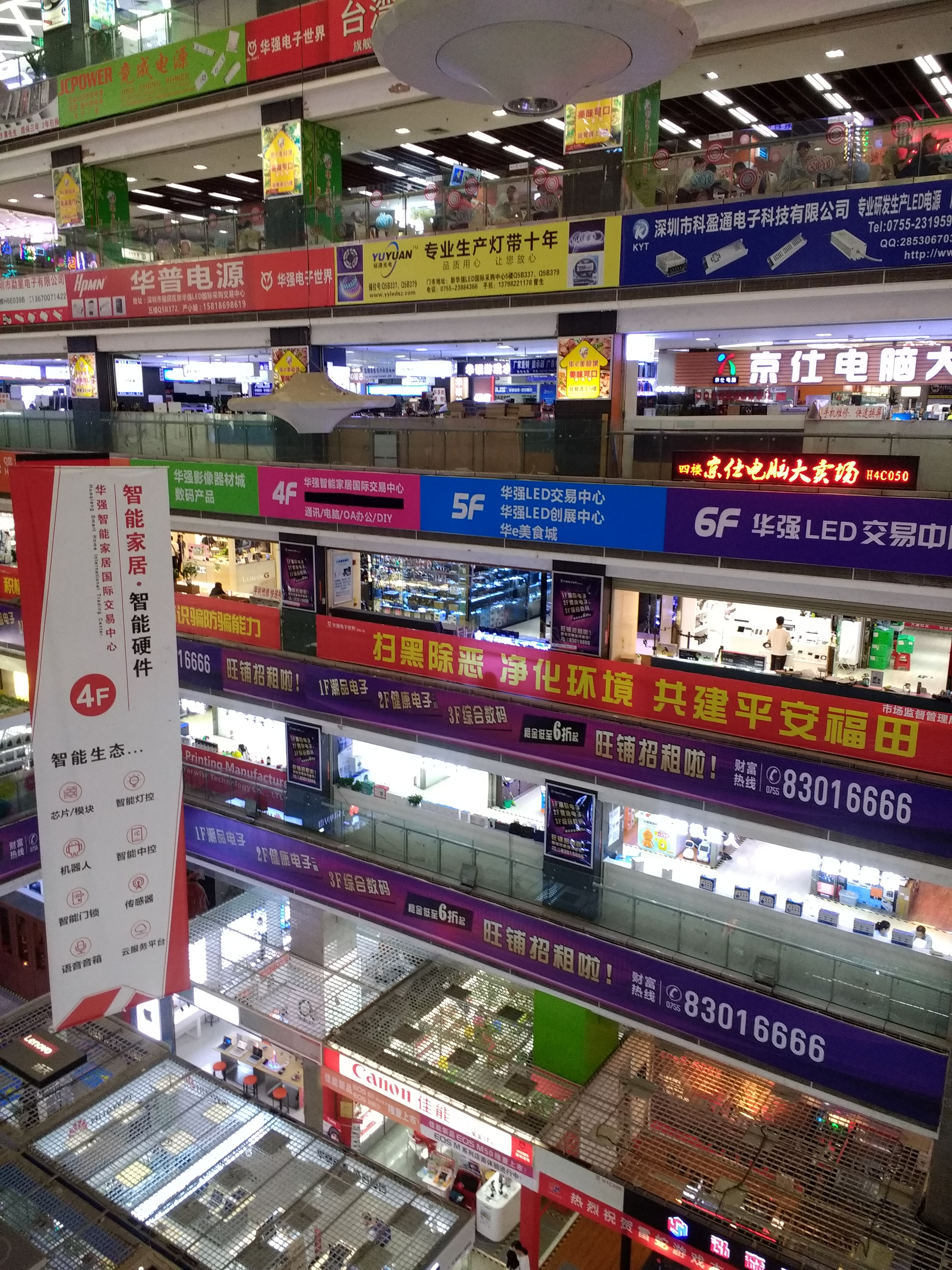
Many electronics manufacturers of Guangdong and beyond rely on the supply of parts from numerous component shops in Shenzhen.

The primary objective of SCM is to fulfill customer demands through the most efficient use of resources, including distribution capacity, inventory, and labor. In theory, a supply chain seeks to match demand with supply and do so with minimal inventory. Various aspects of optimizing the supply chain include liaising with suppliers to eliminate bottlenecks; sourcing strategically to strike a balance between lowest material cost and transportation, implementing just-in-time techniques to optimize manufacturing flow; maintaining the right mix and location of factories and warehouses to serve customer markets; and using location allocation, vehicle routing analysis, dynamic programming, and traditional logistics optimization to maximize the efficiency of distribution.

The term "logistics" applies to activities within one company or organization involving product distribution, whereas "supply chain" additionally encompasses manufacturing and procurement, and therefore has a much broader focus as it involves multiple enterprises (including suppliers, manufacturers, and retailers) working together to meet a customer need for a product or service. However, John Mills et al. note that "early research" on supply chains focused on internal supply relationships within a company.

Starting in the 1990s, several companies chose to outsource the logistics aspect of supply-chain management by partnering with a third-party logistics provider (3PL). Companies also outsource production to contract manufacturers. Technology companies have risen to meet the demand to help manage these complex systems. Cloud-based SCM technologies are at the forefront of next-generation supply chains due to their impact on optimization of time, resources, and inventory visibility. Cloud technologies facilitate work being processed offline from a mobile app which solves the common issue of inventory residing in areas with no online coverage or connectivity.

== Performance ==
Supply chain managers are under constant scrutiny to secure the best pricing for their resources, which becomes a difficult task when faced with the inherent lack of transparency. Cost benchmarking helps to identify competitive pricing within the industry but benchmarking across a range of supply chain performance factors has been recommended as best practice. The SCOR model contains more than 150 key indicators which measure the performance of supply chain operations: see also Supply chain operations reference#Performance measurements. Debra Hofman has noted that "measuring supply chain performance is not a new practice. Most companies today measure at least some aspect of their supply chain and understand the need for a more comprehensive measurement program." However, the abundance of options for potential performance metrics to use is seen as a challenge for supply chain managers. One approach is to relate multiple measures in a hierarchical structure so that interdependencies and the contribution of multiple indicators to the "key" or most significant metrics can be more easily seen. Hofman suggests that the three key indicators of a well-functioning supply chain are:

- Demand forecast accuracy: referring to the difference (if any) between forecasted demand and actual demand. The ability of a supply chain to respond to customer demand is the most significant factor and functions as a predictor of successful delivery throughout the chain
- Perfect order fulfillment: orders which are complete, accurate, on time and in perfect condition
- Supply chain cost, combining all sourcing, production, distribution and customer service costs.

A Cranfield University boardroom survey in 2010 found evidence that many organizations recognized the importance of the supply chain contribution to their business success, with a focus on cost, customer lead-time and customer quality being the primary performance indicators.

== Resilience ==
Supply chain resilience is "the capacity of a supply chain to persist, adapt, or transform in the face of change". For a long time, the interpretation of resilience in the sense of engineering resilience (or robustness) prevailed in supply chain management, leading to the notion of persistence. A popular implementation of this idea is given by measuring the time-to-survive and the time-to-recover of the supply chain, allowing identification of weak points in the system. More recently, the interpretations of resilience in the sense of ecological resilience and social–ecological resilience have led to the notions of adaptation and transformation, respectively. A supply chain is thus interpreted as a social-ecological system which – similar to an ecosystem (e.g. forest) – is able to constantly adapt to external environmental conditions and – through the presence of social actors and their ability to foresee – also to transform itself into a fundamentally new system. This leads to a panarchical interpretation of a supply chain, embedding it into a system of systems, allowing to analyze the interactions of the supply chain with systems that operate at other levels (e.g. society, political economy, planet Earth). For example, these three components of resilience can be identified in relation to the 2021 Suez Canal obstruction, when a ship blocked the canal for several days. Persistence means to "bounce back"; in our example it is about removing the ship as quickly as possible to allow "normal" operations. Adaptation means to accept that the system has reached a "new normal" state and to act accordingly; here, this can be implemented by redirecting ships around the African cape or use alternative modes of transport. Finally, transformation means to question the assumptions of globalization, outsourcing, and linear supply chains and to envision alternatives; in this example this could lead to local and circular supply chains.

Supply chain resilience has been identified as an important business issue. The United Kingdom's Confederation of British Industry reported in 2014 that a significant number of businesses had reshored parts of their supply chain to European locations, with many identifying supply chain resilience as "a key factor in their decision to do so".

== Social responsibility ==
Incidents like the 2013 Savar building collapse with more than 1,100 victims have led to widespread discussions about corporate social responsibility across global supply chains. Wieland and Handfield (2013) suggest that companies need to audit products and suppliers and that supplier auditing needs to go beyond direct relationships with first-tier suppliers (those who supply the main customer directly). They also demonstrate that visibility needs to be improved if the supply cannot be directly controlled and that smart and electronic technologies play a key role to improve visibility. Finally, they highlight that collaboration with local partners, across the industry and with universities is crucial to successfully manage social responsibility in supply chains. This incident also highlights the need to improve workers safety standards in organizations. Hoi and Lin (2012) note that corporate social responsibility can influence the enacting of policies that can improve occupational safety and health management in organizations. In fact, international organizations with presence in other nations have a responsibility to ensure that workers are well protected by policies in an organization to avoid safety related incidents.

== Specific industries ==
=== Food supply chains ===
Many agribusinesses and food processors obtain raw materials from smallholder farmers, particularly in sectors such as coffee, cocoa and sugar. In some supply chains, businesses have adopted more traceable sourcing practices by purchasing crops directly from farmers or through established aggregators rather than relying on multiple intermediaries. These approaches can help businesses monitor the origin of agricultural products and address concerns related to food safety, child labour, environmental sustainability, crop quality and agricultural productivity.

In October 2009, the European Commission issued a Communication concerning "a better functioning food supply chain in Europe", addressing the three sectors of the European economy which comprise the food supply chain: agriculture, food processing industries, and the distribution sectors. An earlier interim report on food prices (published in December 2008) had already raised concerns about the food supply chain. Arising out of the two reports, the Commission established a "European Food Prices Monitoring Tool", an initiative developed by Eurostat and intended to "increase transparency in the food supply chain".

In March 2022 the Commission noted "the need for EU agriculture and food supply chains to become more resilient and sustainable".

=== Clothing products ===
The supply chain in the fashion industries has some unique properties, as clothing fashion changes several times a year (often seasonally). The supply chain for clothing often requires constant analysis of new fashion trends to manage the quantity needed for various markets.

== Regulation ==
Supply chain security has become particularly important in recent years. As a result, supply chains are often subject to global and local regulations. In the United States, several major regulations emerged in 2010 that have had a lasting impact on how global supply chains operate. These new regulations include the Importer Security Filing (ISF) and additional provisions of the Certified Cargo Screening Program. EU's draft supply chain law are due diligence requirements to protect human rights and the environment in the supply chain.

== Trends affecting supply chains ==
The consulting firm Deloitte refers to more extensive supply chains emerging and greater complexity emerging due to increasing globalization of market access, along with seeing reconfiguration of supply chains as an observable trend. Some supply chain reconfiguration has been undertaken for cost reduction purposes, but other objectives include speedier delivery to customers and the creation of new value-adding services.

With easier access to different kinds of alternative products in today's markets, the contribution of product design to generating demand is more significant than ever. In addition, as supply—and therefore competition—among companies for the limited market demand increases, and as pricing and other marketing elements become less distinguishing factors, product design plays a different role by providing attractive features to generate demand. In this context, demand generation is used to define how attractive a product design is in terms of creating demand. In other words, it is the ability of a product's design to generate demand by satisfying customer expectations. However, product design affects not only demand generation but also manufacturing processes, cost, quality, and lead time. Product design directly affects the associated supply chain and its requirements, including manufacturing, transportation, quality, quantity, production schedules, material selection, production technologies, production policies, regulations, and laws. Broadly, the success of the supply chain depends on product design and the capabilities of the supply chain; the reverse is also true: the success of the product depends on the supply chain that produces it.

According to an industrial engineering study which looked at a process for Design for Supply Chain (DFSC), since the product design imposes multiple requirements on the supply chain, then once a product design is completed, it drives the structure of the supply chain, limiting the flexibility of engineers to generate and evaluate different (and potentially more cost-effective) supply-chain alternatives. DFSC is described as

a process that aims to drastically reduce the product life cycle costs ... improve product quality, improve efficiency and improve profitability for all partners in the supply chain.

Supply chain consultant Anthony Tarantino has identified a number of best practices affecting the resilience and operation of supply chains, including the formation of multi-disciplinary centres of excellence, hybrid supply chain organizations which optimize the balance between centralization and de-centralization, and more extensive use of both structured and unstructured data.

Big data is increasingly being utilized in supply chain management, especially in the strategic purchasing and supply management sector.

Moore et al. note a trend towards strategic supply-base reduction as a mechanism for leading businesses to reduce costs and improve supplier-related performance, and similarly Ogden identifies a company's decision-making on the number of suppliers it will engage with for each product or service as an important aspect of the design of a supply chain. Determining the number of suppliers logically precedes an RFP process for determining which suppliers will form part of the supply chain. Morgan refers to an "n + 1 rule" example in the business practice of IT component supplier Intel, whereby the maximum number of suppliers required to maintain production levels for each component is determined, and no more than one additional supplier is engaged with for each component.

With the increased complexity and b2b activity associated with economic growth, actors often seek to view supply chain collaboration as a part of the value adding activities in a value chain.

== See also ==
- Supply-chain sustainability
- Digital Supply Chain
- Software supply chain
- Freight forwarder
- Logistics
- Supply chain attack
- 2021 global supply chain crisis
