= OMG Business Architecture Special Interest Group =

Working group of the Object Management Group

Business Architecture Special Interest Group of the OMG
- Abbreviation: BASIG
- Formation: 2007; 19 years ago
- Type: Working group
- Purpose: Promote industry consensus and develop a set of standards around business architecture
- Location: United States
- Official language: English
- Parent organization: Object Management Group (OMG)
- Website: www.omg.org/bawg/

The Business Architecture Special Interest Group (BASIG) is a working group on business architecture of the Object Management Group (OMG), known for their contribution to the history of business architecture. It was founded in 2007 as the Business Architecture Working Group (BAWG).

== History ==
=== Foundation ===
In 2007, the OMG Technical Meeting on December 12, 2007 in Burlingame, California gave the following rationale for the foundation of a specialized working group on business architecture:

In looking at the link between IT and the business, it has become apparent that there needs to be more formally defined sets of relationships between IT architecture and business architecture. In addition, the concept of business architecture is probably 10-15 years behind the maturity of the IT architecture world. For example, the relationship between business rules and processes is not apparent and the role of organizational governance is similarly disconnected.

Therefore, we are initiating the business architecture working group (BAWG). Business architecture was recently defined as - "Formal models and diagrammatic representations of governance structures, business semantics and value streams across the extended enterprise." This can certainly be debated, but there is no argument to the fact that there is a need for formalization of business architecture to align business to business and business to IT...

Maglio (2010) summarized, that "in 2007, the Business Architecture Working Group (BAWG) was founded as part of the Object Management Group (OMG). The BAWG aims at establishing industry standards, supporting the creation, and alignment of business blueprints."

=== Definition of Business Architecture ===
In the 2007 announcement, the working group proposed the following working definition of Business Architecture:

Formal models and diagrammatic representations of governance structures, business semantics and value streams across the extended enterprise.

The initial definition developed into the following well known 2008 definition:

A blueprint of the enterprise that provides a common understanding of the organization and is used to align strategic objectives and tactical demands

The definition was first published on the working groups homepage bawg.omg.org, and first cited in Solaimani et al. (2010) In the Business Architecture Working Group (BAWG) wiki (2010) there was a further discussion on the definition, which was presented as:

A formal blueprint of governance structures, business semantics and value streams across the extended enterprise.

=== Different views of an organization ===
In order to develop an integrated view of an enterprise, many different views of an organization are typically developed. Each "view" is typically a diagram that illustrates a way of understanding the enterprise by highlighting specific information about it. The key views of the enterprise that may be provided by business architecture address several aspects of the enterprise; they are summarized by the Object Management Group (2012) as follows:

- The Business Strategy view captures the tactical and strategic goals that drive an organization forward...
- The Business Capabilities view describes the primary business functions of an enterprise and the pieces of the organization that perform those functions...
- The Value stream view defines the set the end-to-end set of activities that deliver value to external and internal stakeholders...
- The Business Knowledge view establishes the shared semantics (e.g., customer, order, and supplier) within an organization and relationships between those semantics (e.g., customer name, order date, supplier name)...
- The Organizational view captures the relationships among roles, capabilities and business units, the decomposition of those business units into subunits, and the internal or external management of those units.

In addition to the above views of the enterprise, the relationships connect the aforementioned views form the foundation of the business architecture implementation. This foundation provides the framework that supports the achievement of key goals; planning and execution of various business scenarios; and delivery of bottom line business value.

== Organization ==
=== Meetings ===
BAWG Technical Meetings:

- December 10–14, 2007 - Burlingame, CA, meeting notes
- March 10–14, 2008 - Washington, DC,
- June 23–27, 2008 - Ottawa, CA
- September 22–26, 2008 - Orlando, FL
- December 8–12, 2008 - Santa Clara, CA
- March 23–27, 2009 - Washington, DC

=== Chairs ===
- 2007 Dec. 12, 2007 meeting, Facilitators: Geoff Balmes & Neal McWhorter.
- 2008 Co-Chair: Neal McWhorter, Enterprise Agility, Inc.; Geoff Balmes, Collaborative Consulting & William M. Ulrich, Tactical Strategy Group, Inc.

== Participants, a selection ==
=== Geoff Balmes ===
Geoff Balmes (born c. 1958) is an American business architect. He obtained his BA in computer science at the University of Georgia in 1981. He has worked his way up in industry from systems consultant, systems analyst and process architect to business architect. Described himself as "Change Management Specialist and Senior Business Architect skilled at structuring the business and aligning IT and business strategies." He published one article: Balmes, Geoffrey. "A Collaborative Framework for Business Architecture." Cutter IT Journal 21.3 (2008): 21.

=== Fred A. Cummins ===
Fred Cummins (born c. 1958) is an American business systems architect, and co-chair of the Business Modeling and Integration Domain Task Force since 1999. He obtained BSEE from Kettering University, and his JD in law from Wayne State University Law School. He wrote the books "Developing Business Systems with CORBA" (1999), "Enterprise Integration: An Architecture for Enterprise Application and Systems Integration" (2003), and "Building the Agile Enterprise" (2009), and several articles, and holds a series of patents Co-develops the Value Delivery Modeling Language (VDML).

=== Neal McWhorter ===
Neal McWhorter (born c. 1962) is an American strategic business technology consultant. He obtained his BA in economics from The University of Chicago in 1984, and in 1986-87 studied for his M.A. in education administration at Harvard University. He started his career as analyst in equity investment (1984–91), was manager at Price Waterhouse (1991–94), and consultant at Lockheed Martin Information Technology (1997–98). He chairs the Business Architecture SIG since 2010, and co-founded the Business Architecture Guild in 2010 and is board member ever since. He authored several papers and co-authored with William M. Ulrich the 2011 book "Business Architecture: The Art and Practice of Business Transformation" (VIAF)

=== Jim Rhyne ===
Jim Rhyne (born c. 1950) is an American business/IT architecture consultant. He obtained his PhD in computer science and linguistics at the University of Texas at Austin in 1976, while working as assistant professor at the University of Houston. He made his career as distinguished engineer at IBM from 1977 to 2009. He was IBM Representative at the Object Management Group from 1989 to 1995, jointed the OMG Business Architecture Working Group in 2009, and is one of the main contributors to the Business Architecture Guild since 2010. He authored much of the BASIG wiki in 2009-10.

=== William M. Ulrich ===
William M. Ulrich (born c. 1956) is an American business architecture consultant, consultant at Cutter Consortium, director and lecturer, known for development of 'The Systems Redevelopment Methodology' (TSRM) in the 1990s,[1][2] on legacy systems in the 2000s[3] and more recently on his work on business architecture.

== Publications ==
- Business Architecture Working Group. Balanced Scorecard Metamodel. The Object Management Group (OMG) (2010),
- Business Architecture Working Group, Business Architecture Working Group, Definition (http://bawg.omg.org)
- Ulrich, William, and Neal McWhorter. "Defining requirements for a business architecture standard." Version 7 (2010): 2-22.
