= Paul Harmon =

Paul Harmon may refer to:

- Paul Harmon (artist) (born 1939), American artist
- Paul Harmon (management author) (born 1942), American management consultant
