= Gerrit Versteeg =

Gerrit Versteeg may refer to:

- Gerrit Versteeg (urban architect) (1872–1938), Dutch architect
- Gerrit Versteeg (enterprise architect) (born 1960), Dutch enterprise architect
