= Scor =

Scor or SCOR may refer to:

- Supply-chain operations reference, a process reference model.
- Scór, a division of the Gaelic Athletic Association.
- Society and College of Radiographers (SCoR), a British professional body representing Radiographers within the UK.
- SCOR SE, a global reinsurer based in France.
- South Coast Railway zone (SCoR), the 18th railway zone announced in India.
- Scientific Committee on Oceanic Research (SCOR), a body of the International Science Council
