= Michael Rosen (enterprise architect) =

American computer scientist

Michael Rosen (born 1956) is an American enterprise architect, and management consultant, known for his work on Common Object Request Broker Architecture (1998), and Applying service-oriented architecture.

== Biography ==
After attending the Albert Einstein High School in Maryland, Rosen obtained his BS in Electronics Engineering from the University of Maryland College Park in 1978. In 2013 he continued his PhD study at the Radboud University on advancements in the field of business architecture under Erik Proper.

After graduation Rosen started his career in industry. In 1982 he joined Digital Equipment Corporation, where he worked in various positions in software development of distributed technologies, operating systems, middleware, and transaction processing. In 1997 he moved to BEA Systems, where he was product architect. Since 1999 he has been Enterprise Architect and CTO for several companies, and from 2003 to 2013 he was also Director of Business and Enterprise Architecture at Cutter Consortium. Since 2004 he is also Chief Scientist at the Wilton Consulting Group, a consultancy firm specialized in business architecture, enterprise architecture and service-oriented architecture.

In 2011 Rosen co-founded of the Business Architecture Guild with William M. Ulrich and others, and is its Vice-President ever since. He is representative for the Business Architecture Guild in the Federation of Enterprise Architecture Professional Organizations, and member of its board of directors.

== Selected Publication ==
- Rosen, Michael, and David A. Curtis. Integrating CORBA and COM applications. Wiley, 1998.
- Harmon, Paul, Michael Rosen, and Michael Guttman. Developing e-business systems & architectures: A manager's guide. Morgan Kaufmann, 2001.
- Rosen, M., Lublinsky, B., Smith, K. T., & Balcer, M. J. (2008). Applied SOA: service-oriented architecture and design strategies. John Wiley & Sons.

Articles, a selection:

- Frankel, D. S., Harmon, P., Mukerji, J., Odell, J., Owen, M., Rivitt, P., Rosen, M... & Soley, R. M. (2003). "The Zachman framework and the OMG's model driven architecture." Business Process Trends, (9).

== Patents ==
- Rosen, Mike. "Method and apparatus for three dimensional internet and computer file interface." U.S. Patent No. 6,938,218. 30 Aug. 2005.
- Rosen, Mike. "Display method and apparatus for facilitating interaction with Web sites." U.S. Patent No. 6,922,815. 26 Jul. 2005.
- Rosen, Mike. "Modular core wall construction system." U.S. Patent Application 11/067,369.
