= David Frankel (disambiguation) =

David Frankel (born 1959) is an American film director, screenwriter and producer.

David Frankel may also refer to:

- David Frankel (entrepreneur) (born 1970), South African internet entrepreneur
- David Frankel (archaeologist), Australian archaeologist
- David S. Frankel (born 1950), American information technology expert
- David ben Naphtali Fränkel (1704–1762), German rabbi
