= Edwin E. Tozer =

British retired management and IT consultant and SF author

Edwin Ellis (Ed) Tozer (born 1943) is a British retired management and IT consultant and SF author, particularly known for his early work on business information systems in the 1970s and 1980s.

== Life and work ==
Tozer started his career in the manufacturing and mining industry. In 1969 he became junior systems analyst at the management consultancy firm Scicon in London; a subsidiary of British Petroleum, originally known as Scientific Control Systems, chaired by Sir Maurice Kendall. After spells with other consulting firms, he worked with James Martin's European operation from 1982 to 1984.

In 1984 he founded Edwin E. Tozer Limited, specialized in data management study, which he dissolved after his retirement in 2008. In 1984 he published his first book, entitled "Application Development Tools." in 1988 his second book, "Planning for effective business Information systems," and in 1996 his third book, entitled "Strategic Is/It Planning."

Since his retirement in the new millennium he has been writing SF literature.

== Work ==
In the 1970s Tozer became involved in the CODASYL development of database languages, and wrote his first articles on databases and systems analysis and design He specialized in "effective application of Information Technology to business and administrative problems."

=== Database Systems Analysis and Design, 1976 ===
In the 1976 article "Database Systems Analysis and Design," Tozer made a comparison between the database field and the evolving field of the Programming technology. He argued:

Developments in the database field have tended to emphasise programming technology, with a dearth of accompanying progress in systems analysis and design methods. This paper puts forward an overall view of system design which is intended to act as a constraining framework. It is based upon a pragmatic approach and is presented in a form which could be (and is being) used on large scale implementation projects.

And furthermore:

Orderly analysis and design procedures are encouraged. The taking of premature design decisions is discouraged, especially through the recognition of three distinct views of data: conceptual, implementation and storage, and through recognition of distinctions between design of each of these, specification of mappings between them, and design of programs and run sequences. It is envisaged that specific procedures developed elsewhere (see references) could be incorporated into the methodology described here.

=== Developing strategies for management information systems, 1986 ===
In the 1989 article "Developing strategies for management information systems," Tozer presented a model for developing information systems. Tozer's approach was based on his experience of "planning projects in a variety of industries, including wholesale and retail banking, consumer credit, chemicals, Multinational manufacturing and distribution and the oil industry." Tozer presented a model, which consisted of the following four phases:

- Phase 1: Determine business information needs: This results from the analysis of a series of senior management interviews which are conducted according to a predefined format. The analysis goes through the stages of functional objectives, critical success factors, control information and other quantitative means for determining the successful achievement of critical success factors, leading to a definition of specific information needs.
- Phase 2: Development of conceptual architecture for systems and data: This phase produces clear architecture statements for application systems and associated conceptual database...
- Phase 3: Determine key priorities and system groupings...
- Phase 4: Migration plane. The final sets of deliverables are the plans for achieving the business and technical systems as outlined in these architectures...

The key features of this model, according to Azad (1990) were:

1. [ït] starts with business planning process dealing with logical links and dependencies on corporate and divisional plans.
2. Is pragmatic and hence practical.
3. Combines formality and business expediency.
4. Takes account of trends in business and information planning.
5. Encourages the active use of up to date approach in the development if information systems utilising the fourth generation language by the user.
6. Follows through into the development of a complete, practical, business orientated information system dealing with what must be done, how long it takes, and how much it is going to cost.
7. Is open with regard to extension and enhancement.
8. Has been used successfully in major corporations, continues to be used and hence is continuing to develop further.

In this 1986 paper Tozer was one of the first to propose the concept of business architecture in the field of business information systems planning.

=== Planning for effective business Information systems, 1988 ===
In his 1988 Planning for effective business Information systems, Tozer developed a particular view on Enterprise Data Planning, that dealt with the complexities of extracting key business needs from senior management and then defining relevant architectural visions for the specific enterprise.

In the early 1980s James Martin had been one of the pathfinders in data planning methodologies. He was one of the first to identify data as being an enterprise wide asset that required management, and had developed a series of tools and methods to support that process.

Most of the large consulting firms developed their own methods to address the same basic issue. Frequently, their approaches were incorporated into their own branded system development methodologies that encompassed the complete systems development life-cycle.

=== Strategic IS/IT Planning, 1996 ===
Tozer's "Strategic IS/IT Planning", was published in 1996 by Butterworth Heinemann as part of the Datamation Professional Series. The book mentioned to offer:

- Supports a range of business planning techniques such as Portfolio Management and Value Chain Analysis.
- Helps to ensure accurate and continuing aligning of IS/IT strategy with business goals and intentions.
- Delivers a complete IS/IT plan, integrated with the business planning process, with effective provision for implementation and continuing maintenance.
- Incorporates the latest advances in information technology, including Open Systems and Client/Server.

The book was the most comprehensive outline of Tozer's approaches, though it now appears very dated; for example because it didn't even mention the Internet.

=== Morphosis, 2010 ===
In his 2010 science fiction novel "Morphosis," Tozer has been "speculating that mankind as an evolving species may still be in an early, vulnerable, fledgling state, as much at risk from itself as from environmental factors and competition from other species... [and] sometimes wonders whether it may be necessary - albeit difficult - for us as a species to shed some of the attributes and ingrained reflexes such as our tendency to violent conflict which we developed during our evolutionary struggle for survival so far before we can hope to reach our destiny as a mature species on the wider stage."

== Selected publications ==
- Tozer, Edwin E. Application Development Tools. Elsevier Science Inc., 1984.
- E. E. Tozer. Planning for effective business Information systems, 1988
- E. E. Tozer. Strategic Is/It Planning. 1996.
- Ed Tozer. Morphosis, 2010.

Articles, a selection:

- D. A. Hawley, J. S. Knowles, E. E. Tozer. "Database Consistency and the CODASYL DBTG Proposals." Comput. J. 18(3): 206-212 (1975)
- Tozer, E. E. "Database Systems Analysis and Design". ECI. 1976: 193–224.
- E. E. Tozer. "Database Design Experience." ER 1979: 623-624
- Tozer, Edwin E (1986). "Developing strategies for management information systems". Long Range Planning. 19 (4): 31–40. doi:10.1016/0024-6301(86)90267-0.
- Tozer, Edwin E (1986). "Developing plans for information systems". Long Range Planning. 19 (5): 63–75. doi:10.1016/0024-6301(86)90010-5.
