= Eugene Biel-Bienne =

Austrian-American painter

- Born: November 27, 1902; Vienna, Austria
- Died: 1969 (aged 66–67); Nashville, Tennessee
- Education: Academy of Fine Arts Vienna; University of Vienna; University of Cologne
- Occupation: Painter
- Spouse: Herthe Marie

Eugene Biel-Bienne (1902–1969) was an Austrian painter who spent most of his career in the United States..

== Biography ==
=== Early life ===
Eugene Biel-Bienne was born as Egon V. Biel on November 27, 1902, in Vienna, Austria. His father served as the Austrian Ambassador to Japan. He was raised as a Catholic. He was educated at the Academy of Fine Arts Vienna, the University of Vienna and the University of Cologne, where he received a PhD in Art History.

=== Career ===
He started his career as a painter in Paris, France, where he became associated with the School of Paris in the 1930s. He also associated himself with the existentialist philosopher Paul Tillich (1886–1965), and he became interested in the psychoanalytic findings of Sigmund Freud (1856-1939) and the expressionist music of Arnold Schoenberg (1874–1951). In 1936, he had his first solo exhibition at the Wildenstein Institute in Paris.

He served with the French army during the Second World War. He was critical of the Nazis on French radio and drew disparaging caricatures of their leadership. When they invaded France, he moved to the South of France, where he joined the French resistance. During that time, he received stipends from the American Guild for German Cultural Freedom and from Quakers.

Marie Norton Harriman, wife of W. Averell Harriman (1891-1986) and director of the Marie Harriman Gallery in New York City, helped him and his wife be evacuated from France. Thanks to her help, the couple arrived in New York City in 1942. Once in New York, he was patronised by Baroness Hilla von Rebay (1890-1967), also a painter and the mistress of Solomon R. Guggenheim (1861-1949). He taught at Fordham University, Parsons The New School for Design and The New School for Social Research. Meanwhile, he also exhibited his paintings at the Solomon R. Guggenheim Museum and the Wehe Gallery. He also exhibited at the Pennsylvania Academy of the Fine Arts in Philadelphia, Pennsylvania.

From 1954 to 1956, he lived in Caracas, Venezuela, where his sister-in-law lived, and he exhibited his paintings in the Museo de Arte Contemporáneo. He moved back to the US and served as the Director of the French-American Art Institute in Washington, D.C., from 1956 to 1959. That year, after his wife died, he moved to Nashville, Tennessee, and joined the Department of Fine Arts in the College of Arts and Science at Vanderbilt University as a faculty member and taught drawing and painting. The department chair, Walter Sharp had hired Biel-Bienne and was an enthusiastic supporter. However, when Sharp retired, Biel-Bienne lost support and the new director fired him. He also sided with Gordon D. Kaufman (1925-2011), who was teaching at the Vanderbilt University Divinity School, to support African-American activist James Lawson, who was expelled from the Vanderbilt campus in 1960. Meanwhile, he continued to produce paintings, and exhibited at the Cheekwood Botanical Garden and Museum of Art, the Parthenon and the Vanderbilt Art Gallery. However, he was fired by Vanderbilt University in 1963, though he stayed in his one-bedroom apartment close to campus overlooking the Centennial Park until he died six years later. Paul Harmon, another painter from Nashville, inherited the executorship of his estate.

Some of his paintings are exhibited in the Smithsonian American Art Museum in Washington, D.C. Others can be found in the Musée National d'Art Moderne in Paris, the National Gallery in Berlin, the Victoria and Albert Museum in London, and the Cheekwood Botanical Garden and Museum of Art in Nashville.

=== Personal life ===
He was married to Herthe Marie. She was Jewish. During the Second World War, her car was strafed, leaving her disabled. She died ten years before he did, in 1959, while they were living in Washington, D.C.

He died in 1969 in Nashville.

== Selected paintings ==
- The Little Round Table (Smithsonian American Art Museum, Washington, D.C., 1950).
- Dancer (Smithsonian American Art Museum, Washington, D.C., 1956).
- Après la Visite de la Mort (1959).
- The Mockery of Christ (Vanderbilt University Divinity School, 1963).
