= Enterprise data planning =

This article or section reads like an advertisement for EDMworks. To meet Wikipedia's quality standards and comply with Wikipedia's neutral point of view policy, it may require cleanup.

Enterprise data planning is the starting point for enterprise wide change. It states the destination and describes how you will get there. It defines benefits, costs and potential risks. It provides measures to be used along the way to judge progress and adjust the journey according to changing circumstances.

Data is fundamental to investment enterprises. Effective, economic management of data underpins operations and enables transformations needed to satisfy customer demands, competition and regulation. Data warehouse(s) and other aspects of the overall data architecture are critical to the enterprise.

EDMworks has created a strategic data planning approach for the Investment Sector. It consists of a planning process, planning intranets, templates and training materials.

EDMworks planning process is based on the belief that extensive domain knowledge significantly shortens planning iterations and enables progressively higher quality plans to be produced and implemented. This approach drives the development of an effective and economic enterprise data architecture.

Enterprise data planning is based on proven business disciplines. Key architectural layers for data and applications are then added in order to provide an enterprise wide understanding of the uses and interdependencies of data. This enables the definition of the core components of the EDM plan:

- Industry structure and business objectives
- Assessment of systems and services
- Target architecture for applications, data and infrastructure
- Target organization structures
- Systems, database, infrastructure and organizational plans
- Business case, costs, benefits, results and risks.

EDMworks uses several components from the Open Systems Group TOGAF enterprise systems planning process. TOGAF acts as an extension to good business planning methods to provide a framework for the development of the systems and data architectural components.

== History ==
James Martin was one of the pathfinders in data planning methodologies. He was one of the first to identify data as being an enterprise wide asset that required management. He developed a series of tools and methods to support that process.

Most of the large consulting firms developed their own methods to address the same basic issue. Frequently, their approaches were incorporated into their own branded system development methodologies that encompassed the complete systems development life-cycle.

Others, such as Ed Tozer, developed more focused offerings that dealt with the complexities of extracting key business needs from senior management and then defining relevant architectural visions for the specific enterprise.

From these various sources, the concepts of Business, Data, Applications and Technology Architectures emerged.

The Open Group Architectural Framework (TOGAF) has taken this work forward and has established a sound method in TOGAF version 9.

EDMworks approach is to adopt these planning and architectural practices as a basis and then add two additional dimensions to the planning and implementation focus:

- Domain knowledge of the Investments sector. Investments is a complex global industry with a common set of characteristics about clients, information vendors, competition and regulation. Domain knowledge significantly improves the quality of the planning and implementation processes
- Development of people and teams. Change is a major feature of in any Enterprise Data Management program and people and teams both need development in order to make EDM effective throughout an organization.
