= David S. Frankel =

American computer scientist

David S. Frankel (born 1950) is an American Information Technology expert and consultant, known for his work on model-driven engineering and semantic information modeling.

== Biography ==
Frankel obtained his BS in Mathematics from the University of Illinois at Urbana-Champaign, and sequentially his Master of Social Work at the same university.

Frankel started his career in the software industry in the 1970s, developing software tools for HP 2100 mini-computers. He became a senior Programmer-Analyst. In 1982 he became an independent consultant, participating in the development of LAN-based database applications. He was Enterprise Architect for several companies, and Lead Standards Architect in the domain of Model-Driven Systems at SAP Labs in California from 2005 to 2012, and independent consultant ever since.

Frankel has been on the Architecture Board of the Object Management Group (OMG) for a long time. In 2003 he published his most cited work "Model Driven Architecture: Applying Mda to Enterprise Computing."

== Selected publications ==
- Frankel, David S. Model Driven Architecture Applying Mda to Enterprise Computing. John Wiley & Sons, 2003. ISBN 978-0-471-46227-9.
- Parodi, John, and David S. Frankel. The MDA journal: model driven architecture straight from the masters. Meghan-Kiffer Press, 2004. ISBN 978-0-929652-25-2.

Articles, a selection:

- David S. Frankel, Harmon, P., Mukerji, J., Odell, J., Owen, M., Rivitt, P., Rosen, M... & Soley, R. M. et al. (2003) "The Zachman Framework and the OMG's Model Driven Architecture," Business Process Trends, 9 (2003).
- Frankel, David S. "The MDA marketing message and the MDA reality." MDA Journal, a Business Process Trends Column (2004).
- Frankel, David S., et al. "A Model-Driven Semantic Web: Reinforcing Complementary Strengths." MDA Journal, Business Process Trends (2004).
- Frankel, D., Hayes, P., Kendall, E., & McGuinness, D. (2004). "The model driven semantic web." In 1st International Workshop on the Model-Driven Semantic Web (MDSW2004), Monterey, California, USA.
