= Harry Bouwman =

Dutch computer scientist

- Born: 1953 (age 72–73); Tilburg
- Education: MA in Political Science -VU University Amsterdam
- Occupations: Information systems researcher Professor at the Åbo Akademi University

Willem Adriaan Gerrit Anton ("Harry") Bouwman (born Tilburg, 1953) is a Dutch Information systems researcher, and professor at the Åbo Akademi University, Institute for Advanced Management Systems Research, known for his work on mobile services, business models and business architecture.

== Biography ==
Bouwman obtained his MA in political science at the VU University Amsterdam in 1979, his PhD at Radboud University Nijmegen, Faculty of Social Science in 1986, and a degree in computer science at the Open University in the Netherlands in 1992.

Bouwman started his career as assistant professor at the University of Amsterdam in 1985. From 1996 to 1998 he was senior consultant at the Netherlands Organisation for Applied Scientific Research, and associate professor in mass communication and communication management at the University Utrecht from 1996 to 1999. Since 1998 he is associate professor of information and communication technology at Delft University of Technology, Faculty of Technology, Policy and Management, and since 2011 Distinguished Professor at the Åbo Akademi University.

Bouwman was visiting professor at the Syracuse University in 2004 and at the Northwestern University in 2009.

== Selected publications ==
- Bouwman, H., Van Den Hooff, B., Van De Wijngaert, L., & Van Dijk, J. (2005). Information and communication technology in organizations: adoption, implementation, use and effects. Sage.
- Bouwman, Harry, Henny De Vos, and Timber Haaker. Mobile service innovation and business models. Springer Science & Business Media, 2008.

Articles, a selection:

- Steinfield, Charles, Thomas Adelaar, and Harry Bouwman. "The dynamics of click-and-mortar electronic commerce: opportunities and management strategies." International Journal of Electronic Commerce 7.1 (2002): 93–119.
- Versteeg, Gerrit, and Harry Bouwman. "Business Architecture: A New Approach to Improving a Corporation's Adaptability to Strategic Change." (2005).
- Versteeg, Gerrit, and Harry Bouwman. "Business architecture: A new paradigm to relate business strategy to ICT." Information Systems Frontiers 8.2 (2006): 91–102.
- López-Nicolás, Carolina, Francisco J. Molina-Castillo, and Harry Bouwman. "An assessment of advanced mobile services acceptance: Contributions from TAM and diffusion theory models." Information & Management 45.6 (2008): 359–364.
- Bouwman, H., van Houtum, H., Janssen, M., & Versteeg, G. (2011). "Business architectures in the public sector: experiences from practice." Communications of the Association for Information Systems, 29(1), 411–426.
