= Philip Newcomb =

American software engineer

Philip H. Newcomb (born 1950s) is an American software engineer and CEO of The Software Revolution, Inc., known for his work in the field of formal methods of software engineering.

== Biography ==
Newcomb started his studies at Indiana University in 1972, and obtained his BSc in Cognitive Psychology in 1976. In 1977 he did graduate work in computer science at the University of Washington and at Carnegie Mellon University. In 1984 he continued his studies at Ball State University, where he obtained his MA in Computer Science in 1988.

In 1983 Newcomb started as researcher at the Boeing Artificial Intelligence Center in Seattle, working in the field of formal methods for software engineering and artificial intelligence. He became senior principal scientist, and in 1989 director of the Software Reverse, Reengineering and Reuse Program. In 1995 he founded his own company, The Software Revolution, Inc., to deliver solutions for software modernization.

In 2012 he was awarded the Stevens Award in recognition of his outstanding contributions to software and systems development.

== Selected publications ==
- Ulrich, William M., and Philip Newcomb. Information Systems Transformation: Architecture-Driven Modernization Case Studies. Morgan Kaufmann, 2010.

Articles, a selection:

- Newcomb, Philip, and Lawrence Markosian. "Automating the modularization of large COBOL programs: application of an enabling technology for reengineering." Reverse Engineering, 1993., Proceedings of Working Conference on. IEEE, 1993.
- Markosian, L., Newcomb, P., Brand, R., Burson, S., & Kitzmiller, T. (1994). "Using an enabling technology to reengineer legacy systems." Communications of the ACM, 37(5), 58-70.
- Newcomb, Philip, and Gordon Kotik. "Reengineering procedural into object-oriented systems." 2013 20th Working Conference on Reverse Engineering (WCRE). IEEE Computer Society, 1995.
- Newcomb, Philip. "Architecture-driven modernization (ADM)." 2013 20th Working Conference on Reverse Engineering (WCRE). IEEE Computer Society, 2005.
