= Jan Godsell =

Professor

Janet Godsell (born March 1971) is professor of operations and supply chain strategy at the University of Warwick. She was formerly a senior lecturer at Cranfield University School of Management. Before that she worked at ICI, Astra Zeneca, and Dyson. She is a graduate of Cranfield University and a chartered engineer and member of the Institution of Mechanical Engineers. She is a member of the Made Smarter Expert Panel and an advocate of supply chain integration and of education in STEM subjects in schools.
