= Paul Harmon (artist) =

- Paul Harmon, artist (photo, Paris 1992)
- Born: 1939 (age 86–87)
- Occupation: Painter

Paul Harmon (born 1939) is an American artist.

== Biography ==
=== Early life ===
Paul Harmon was born in 1939.

=== Career ===
From 1986 to 1998, he divided his time between permanent studios in Paris, France, and Brentwood, Tennessee. His works are exhibited at Tennessee State Museum, the Tampa Museum of Art, the George Bush Presidential Library and Museum, the Museum of Modern Art of Monaco, and the city of Caen, France. He was chosen in 1981 to represent the U.S. in the Bienal de Arte in Medellin. In 1994, he had a major exhibition of his work at the invitation of Caen, France. Curated by Galerie Déprez-Bellorget of Paris, this one-man exhibition was the official art show of the D-Day 50th anniversary remembrances. His work was also featured in the TV movie Pronto.

He has been the recipient of many major awards including the Prix de la Ville de Monaco and the Prix de la Société E.J.A. at the XXIV Prix International D’Art Contemporain de Monte-Carlo. The Harmon painting Walking Man, from this competition was chosen by Princess Caroline of Monaco for her private collection. In connection with the Prix de la Ville de Monaco, a canvas was commissioned by the Principality of Monaco for its permanent collection.

A comprehensive book, “Paul Harmon: Crossing Borders” was published in 2009. This 360-page color volume covers selected canvases from 1961 to mid 2009. Over 526 paintings are featured along with an essay by Art Historian Robert L. McGrath, Professor of Art History, Emeritus, Dartmouth College.

A second book, “Paul Harmon: Inner Voices” was published in late 2016. This 536-page book features in color 324 canvases from 2009 to mid 2016 and selected works on paper from the 1960s to 2016 including 310 originals and 98 prints. There are also images of etched works on scratchboard and fired clay tablets. Including ancillary photos, the total number of images is 776. Included is an insightful essay by the photographer and author, John Guider.

A comprehensive collection of Paul Harmon personal and professional papers and images are maintained by the Archives of American Art, Smithsonian Institution, Washington D.C.

He lives in a 1793 farm house in Brentwood, Tennessee, which is listed on the National Register of Historic Places.

He inherited the executorship of expressionist painter Eugene Biel-Bienne (1902-1969).

=== Personal life ===
He lives on a 1793 farm in Brentwood, Tennessee, which is listed on the National Register of Historic Places.
