= Business architecture =

Business discipline

Aspects of a business represented by a business architecture diagram

In the business sector, business architecture is a discipline that "represents holistic, multidimensional business views of: capabilities, end-to-end value delivery, information, and organizational structure; and the relationships among these business views and strategies, products, policies, initiatives, and stakeholders."

In application, business architecture provides a bridge between an enterprise business model and enterprise strategy on one side, and the business functionality of the enterprise on the other side. It often enables the Strategy to Execution methodology.

People who develop and maintain business architecture are known as business architects.

== Overview ==
The term "business architecture" is often used to mean an architectural description of an enterprise or a business unit, an architectural model, or the profession itself. The Business Architecture Working Group of the Object Management Group (OMG) (2010) describes it as "a blueprint of the enterprise that provides a common understanding of the organization and is used to align strategic objectives and tactical demands." According to the OMG, a blueprint of this type describes "the structure of the enterprise in terms of its governance structure, business processes, and business information." As such, the profession of business architecture primarily focuses on the motivational, operational, and analysis frameworks that link these aspects of the enterprise together.

The key characteristic of the business architecture is that it represents real world aspects of a business, along with how they interact. It is developed by an interdisciplinary practice area focused on defining and analyzing concerns of what business does, how it does it, how it is organized, and how it realizes value. It is used to design competitive structures and processes, leverage existing strengths, and identify potential investment opportunities that advance the business's objectives and drive innovation. Products of this business architecture efforts are used to develop plans, make business decisions and guide their implementations.

In practice, business architecture effort is conducted on its own or as part of an enterprise architecture. While an enterprise architecture practice in the past had focused primarily on the technological aspects of change, the practice is quickly evolving to use a rigorous business architecture approach to address the organizational and motivational aspects of change as well. The alignment between business architecture and enterprise architecture is a natural architectural alignment of two related disciplines. Business architecture represents a business in the absence of any IT architecture while enterprise architecture provides an overarching framework for business and IT architecture.

== History of business architecture ==
The history of business architecture has its origins in the 1980s. In the next decades business architecture has developed into a discipline of "cross-organizational design of the business as a whole" closely related to enterprise architecture. The concept of business architecture has been proposed as a blueprint of the enterprise, as business strategy, and also as the representation of business design.

The concept of business architecture has evolved over the years. It was introduced in the 1980s as architectural domains and as activity of business design. In the 2000s the study and concept development of business architecture accelerated. By the end of the 2000s the first handbooks on business architecture were published, separate frameworks for business architecture were being developed, separate views and models for business architecture were further under construction, the business architect as a profession evolved, and an increasing number of businesses added business architecture to their agenda.

By 2015 business architecture has evolved into a common practice. The business architecture body of knowledge has been developed and is updated multiple times each year, and the interest from the academic world and from top management is growing.

== Business architecture topics ==
=== Different views of an organization ===
In order to develop an integrated view of an enterprise, many different views of an organization are typically developed. Each "view" is typically a diagram that illustrates a way of understanding the enterprise by highlighting specific information about it. The key views of the enterprise that may be provided by business architecture address several aspects of the enterprise; they are summarized by the Object Management Group (2012) as follows:

- The Business Strategy view captures the tactical and strategic goals that drive an organization forward...
- The Business Capabilities view describes the primary business functions of an enterprise and the pieces of the organization that perform those functions...
- The Value Stream view defines the end-to-end set of activities that deliver value to external and internal stakeholders...
- The Business Knowledge view establishes the shared semantics (e.g., customer, order, and supplier) within an organization and relationships between those semantics (e.g., customer name, order date, supplier name)...
- The Organizational view captures the relationships among roles, capabilities and business units, the decomposition of those business units into subunits, and the internal or external management of those units.

In addition to the above views of the enterprise, the relationships that connect the aforementioned views form the foundation of the business architecture implementation. This foundation provides the framework that supports the achievement of key goals; planning and execution of various business scenarios; and delivery of bottom-line business value.

=== Business strategy ===
In the 2006 article "Business Architecture: A new paradigm to relate business strategy to ICT," Versteeg & Bouwman explained the relation between business strategy and business architecture. They wrote:

Business Architecture is directly based on business strategy. It is the foundation for subsequent architectures (strategy embedding), where it is detailed into various aspects and disciplines. The business strategy can consist of elements like strategy statements, organizational goals and objectives, generic and/or applied business models, etc. The strategic statements are analyzed and arranged hierarchically, through techniques like qualitative hierarchical cluster analysis. Based on this hierarchy the initial business architecture is further developed, using general organizational structuring methods and business administration theory, like theories on assets and resources and theories on structuring economic activity.

Versteeg & Bouwman further stipulated, that "the perspectives for subsequent design next to organization are more common: information architecture, technical architecture, process architecture. The various parts (functions, concepts and processes) of the business architecture act as a compulsory starting point for the different subsequent architectures. It pre-structures other architectures. Business architecture models shed light on the scantly elaborated relationships between business strategy and business design."

== Approaches for business architecture ==
=== The Business Architecture Guild ===
The primary purpose of the Business Architecture Guild is "to promote best practices and expand the knowledge-base of the business architecture discipline." The Guild is a non-profit, international membership organization for practitioners and others interested in the developing the field of business architecture. With members on six continents, a strong Advisory Board and a growing number of business partners, the Guild positions itself as a focal point for the evolving practices and disciplines of business architecture.

Founded in late 2010, the Guild opened up membership in the fall of 2011 based on the initial release of A Guide to the Business Architecture Body of Knowledge(R) (BIZBOK(R) Guide). BIZBOK(R), currently at version 13, is a "practical guide for business architecture practitioners and individuals who wish to use business architecture to address business challenges. This practical guide comes in the form of best practices, gleaned from numerous companies and business architecture leaders.".

=== The Business Architecture Association ===
The Business Architecture Association started as a DePaul based organization where practitioners came together to share and explore new ideas around Business Architecture. It later formalized itself into a formal organization that looked to build local chapters where practitioners could gather and share their ideas around Business Architecture. In addition, to building a chapter based organization, the Business Architecture Association coalesced a group of strong practitioners to put together the first practitioner exam. Eventually, the Business Architecture Association formalized the exam and it became the beta version of certified practitioner exam. In 2014, the Business Architecture Guild and the Business Architecture Association, joined forces where the beta exam became cornerstone of the certification program of the Business Architecture Guild looking to solidify the practice of Business Architecture in the marketplace.

=== The ASATE Group Business Capability Framework ===
The ASATE Group Business Capability Framework relies on business capabilities and the eight types of building blocks that make them up (processes, functions, organizational units, know-how assets, information assets, technology assets, brands and natural resource deposits) to model a business architecture. This framework was devised with five criteria in mind: (1) must be aligned with the ANSI/IEEE 1471-2000 standard definition of architecture; (2) must share an anchor point with business strategy, namely capabilities; (3) must rely on common business terms and definitions thereof; (4) must comprise all building block types necessary to model a complete business architecture; and (5) must not be burdened with unnecessary building blocks types.

== Enterprise architecture frameworks encompassing business architecture approaches ==
=== Zachman Framework ===
The Zachman Framework is a popular enterprise architecture framework used by business architects. The framework provides ontology of fundamental enterprise concepts that are defined from the intersection of six interrogative categories: What, How, Where, Who, When, Why, and six perspectives: Executive, Business Management, Architect, Engineer, Technician, and Enterprise. Typically, business architects are interested in the concepts associated with the top two perspectives: Executive and Business Management. The Executive perspective is concerned with the scope and context of the business. The Business Management perspective is concerned with business definition models.

=== The Object Management Group ===
Modeling standards of the Object Management Group (OMG), including the Unified Modeling Language (UML), Model Driven Architecture (MDA), Business Motivation Model (BMM), Semantics of Business Vocabulary and Rules (SBVR) and the Business Process Modeling Notation (BPMN), and the Decision Model and Notation (DMN) enable powerful visual design, execution and maintenance of software and other processes, including IT Systems Modeling and Business Process Management. Currently, OMG works on the Value Delivery Modeling Language (VDML), a standard modeling language for analysis and design of the operation of an enterprise with particular focus on the creation and exchange of value

=== The Open Group ===
The Open Group Architecture Framework (TOGAF) of The Open Group is a community-based standards effort for describing methods and tools used by architecture. It is being developed and continuously improved by the Open Group, a consortium of interested individuals and companies involved in information technology.

According to TOGAF, Business Architecture "defines the business strategy, governance, organization, and key business processes". TOGAF refers to Business Architecture as one of the four architecture domains, which represent the subsets of the overall enterprise architecture with the other three architecture domains being Application Architecture, Data Architecture, and Technology Architecture. The key element of TOGAF, Architecture Development Method, identifies development of Business Architecture as necessary prerequisite for developing other architecture domains and provides guidance in regard to development steps and common artifacts.

=== Industry reference models ===
Industry reference models are frameworks or models that provide a best practice off-the-shelf set of structures, processes, activities, knowledge and skills. The Business Architecture Guild provides reference models for many industries, including government, financial services, insurance, transportation, and healthcare, as well as a common reference model. Other organizations are also beginning to develop complementary models for additional industries.

=== Other industry models ===
Many additional business models exist that can be related to business architecture, but are derived from other approaches, such as operating models and lower-level process frameworks. Examples of these include:

- The Business Process Framework (eTOM), published by the TM Forum, describes the full scope of business processes required by a service provider in the telecommunications industry, and defines key elements and how they interact.
- Process Classification Framework (PCF), published by APQC, creates a common language for organizations to communicate and define work processes comprehensively and without redundancies. Organizations are using it to support benchmarking, manage content, and perform other important performance management activities.
- The Supply-Chain Operations Reference (SCOR) was a proprietary process reference model, published by Supply-Chain Council. Supply-Chain Council merged with APICS in 2014.
- OpenReference is an Open, editable reference for business terms, building towards a common language to describe business performance, processes, practices and terms. The reference is maintained by volunteers of the OpenReference Initiative.

== See also ==
- Capability management in business
- Component business model
