= William M. Ulrich =

American business architecture consultant

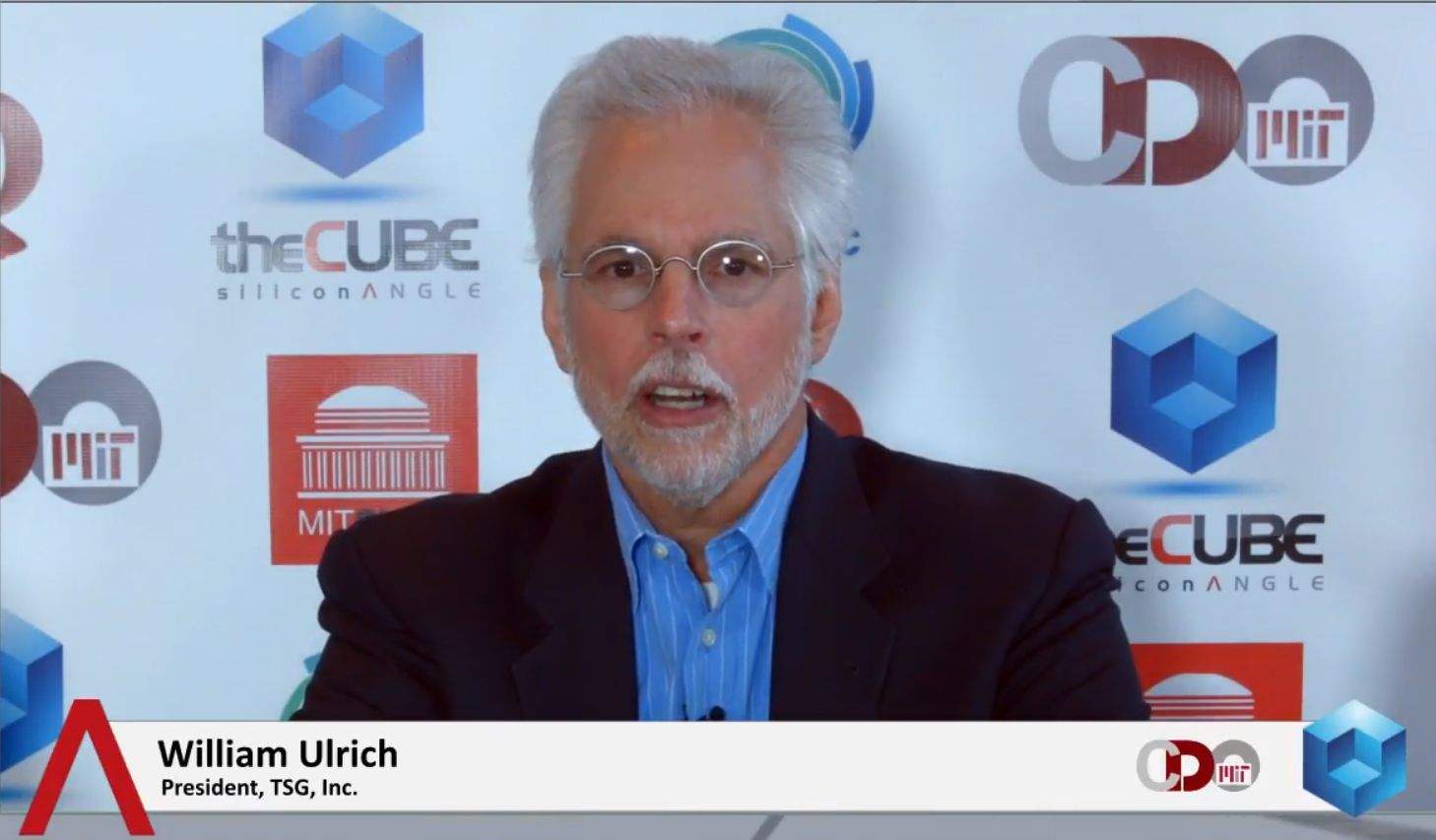
William Ulrich. President, TSG, Inc. at MITCDOIQ 2014

William M. Ulrich (born c. 1956) is an American business architecture consultant, consultant at Cutter Consortium, director and lecturer, known for development of 'The Systems Redevelopment Methodology' (TSRM) in the 1990s, on legacy systems in the 2000s and more recently on his work on business architecture.

== Biography ==
Ulrich started to study at the Western Illinois University in 1974, and obtained his Bachelor of Business, Management Information Sciences in 1978.

After graduation Ulrich started his working in industry. In 1980 he was working for Automated Concepts Inc. on reengineering and reverse engineering. He joined KPMG Peat Marwick in 1983 as Director of Reengineering Strategies, and was promoted into senior management in 1986. In 1990 he founded his own management consultancy firm TSG, INC. Since 2003 he is also Senior Consultant at Cutter Consortium (now Fellow), and since 2010 president of the Business Architecture Guild. Ulrich lectured at the Northeastern Illinois University, and at the Software Engineering Institute. In the Object Management Group (OMG) he co-chairs the Architecture-Driven Modernization Task Force. In 2016, along with Whynde Kuehn, Ulrich co-founded Business Architecture Associates, Inc., an international training and mentoring company. Ulrich holds Certified Business Architect® certification from the Business Architecture Guild.

== Work ==
=== The Systems Redevelopment Methodology ===
The Systems Redevelopment Methodology is developed by Ulrich in the early 1990s. It contained a "set of project management templates and guidelines for transition projects" and it was marketed by James Martin and Company in Reston, Virginia.

The methodology was especially designed to assist organizations "migrate large, aging systems into strategic architectures that support tomorrow's business needs."

=== Legacy systems: transformation strategies, 2002 ===
In his 2002 "In Legacy Systems: Transformation Strategies" Ulrich presents "a step-by-step, phased roadmap to legacy transformation that maximizes business value, while minimizing cost, disruption, and risk. Transformation strategies, organizing disciplines, techniques, and tools reduce the risks of deploying the component-based architectures you need to stay competitive while maximizing the business value of core systems that work."

=== Business Architecture Guild ===
In 2010 Ulrich cofounded the Business Architecture Guild with Michael Rosen, Whynde Kuehn, and others. Its primary purpose is "to promote best practices and expand the knowledge-base of the business architecture discipline." The Guild is a not for profit, international membership organization for practitioners and others interested in the developing the field of business architecture.

Founded in late 2010, the Guild opened up membership in the fall of 2011 based on the initial release of the A Guide to the Business Architecture Body of Knowledge (BIZBOK® Guide). BIZBOK® Guide, currently at version 10.0 is a "practical guide for business architecture practitioners and individuals who wish to use business architecture to address business challenges. This practical guide comes in the form of best practices, gleaned from numerous companies and business architecture leaders."

At 2018, the book titled "A Guide to the Business Architecture Body of Knowledge" (BIZBOK® Guide) is not yet available on Internet for the public. The BIZBOK® Guide is "the go-to guide for business architecture pratictioneers", and to it the Certified Business Architect® program is aligned. There exists "The Business Architecture Quick Guide", an 86-page book summarized by the BIZBOK® Guide, intended as a basic and foundational overview, before selecting topics and business scenarios specific for each role.

=== Business Architecture: The Art and Practice of Business Transformation, 2010 ===
In the Business Architecture: The Art and Practice of Business Transformation, Ulrich and McWhorter summarized the essence of business architecture:

The most important aspect of business architecture is enabling business executives, managers and professionals to take ownership and drive enterprise transformation, a role that has oftentimes been delegated by default to IT. Historically, the term "enterprise architecture" has a tendency to turn off business professionals because they immediately assume that the concept is an IT focused creation. This is not an indictment of IT but rather a call to action for business executives to take ownership of business architecture and related business transformation strategies. The decisions that are made today can make or break organizations going forward into a complex, uncertain future.

== Selected publications ==
- Ulrich, William M. The year 2000 software crisis: challenge of the century. Yourdon Press, 1997.
- Ulrich, William M. Legacy systems: transformation strategies. Englewood Cliffs: Prentice Hall, 2002.
- Ulrich, William M., and Philip Newcomb. Information Systems Transformation: Architecture-Driven Modernization Case Studies. Morgan Kaufmann, 2010.
- William Ulrich, Neal McWhorter, Business Architecture: The Art and Practice of Business Transformation, Meghan-Kiffer Press, 2010.

Articles, a selection:

- Ulrich, William M. "Re-engineering: De ning an Integrated Migration Framework."." CASE Trends Magazine (1990).
- Ulrich, William M. "Re-engineering: Defining an integrated migration framework." Software Reengineering, IEEE Computer Society Press, Los Altos, California (1993): 108-118.
- Ulrich, William M. "Knowledge mining: Business rule extraction and reuse." Cutter IT Journal 12 (1999): 21-26.
- Ulrich, William. "Modernization Standards Roadmap." Information Systems Transformation: Architecture-Driven Modernization Case Studies (2010): 45.
