= Value Delivery Modelling Language =

Value Delivery Modeling Language (VDML) is a standard modeling language for analysis and design of the operation of an enterprise with particular focus on the creation and exchange of value.

In 2009, the Object Management Group (OMG) launched a Request for Proposal (RfP) to develop a standard for value modeling. The goal of this RfP is to integrate the different existing value models and give a complete overview of the business logic of an organisation. To reach this goal, the standard has to satisfy nine requirements:

1. The metamodel must satisfy the characteristics of the Meta-Object Facility (MOF) metamodel. MOF is a standard developed for model-driven engineering and is structured in 4 layers. The top layer (M3 model) consists of a language that is used to construct metamodels. These metamodels are the second layer (M2 model) and they describe the third layer (M1 layer). The last layer, the data layer is used to describe real objects.
2. The metamodel must support the analysis of the activities of the value chain to support the identification of differentiators. The internal value chain should as such be part of the metamodel.
3. A capability analysis must be possible. This is closely linked to the second requirement. A capability is the possibility to execute some sort of activity. The quality of an activity is as such dependent on the capabilities of the organisation. As such the metamodel should include a way to analyse these capabilities.
4. The value model should have an adequate level of detail to include both activities and capabilities on the operational level. However a value model focuses on the inputs and outputs unlike a process model such as BPMN.
5. The value model should be able to aggregate activities at multiple levels to analyse them from different angles (e.g. strategic vs operational).
6. It should be possible to couple performance- and cost aspects to the activities
7. The relationships with other organisations such as competitors and strategic alliances should be included.
8. The events that trigger an activity should be included in the metamodel
9. The user should be able to include its own specifications.

The VDML standard integrates 7 existing value models:

- Porter's Value Chain
- Business Model Ontology of Osterwalder
- Verna Allee's Value Network Analysis
- E3-Value analysis
- Resources, Events, Agents (REA) analysis
- Value Stream Mapping
- Service-Oriented Business Architecture analysis

The use of VDML diagrams to support business model innovation is discussed in

VDML has been applied to a use case in manufacturing. It demonstrates the use of VDML for modeling and analysis of a proposed change to an as-is business system.
