= Paul Harmon (management author) =

Paul Harmon (born 1942) is an American management consultant, author and analyst, known for his work in the field of Expert systems in the 1980s, and more recently on Business process management (BPM).

== Biography ==
Harmon got his HS degree from Shortridge High School in 1960, and received a BA in biology from Earlham College in 1965. In 1968-69 he studied Psychology and Education at the Columbia University in the City of New York.

He began his career working for Geary Rummler at Praxis Corp. in New York City. Throughout the seventies he owned his own consulting company and did major process redesign projects with clients like Bank of America, Wells Fargo, Security Pacific, Prudential, and Citibank.

In the Eighties and Nineties Harmon was a senior consultant and head of Cutter Consortium's Distributed Architecture practice. From 1985 to 2000 he wrote Cutter newsletters, including expert systems strategies, CASE strategies, and component development strategies.

Currently Harmon is the Executive Editor of www.BPTrends.com—a monthly webizine that publishes articles and reports on Business Process topics. (BPTrends was founded in 2003 by Celia Wolf and Paul Harmon) He serves as the senior BPM market analyst at BPTrends. He is also the Senior Methodologist of BPTrends Associates a consulting group that offers training and consulting services, based on the BPTrends BPM Methodology. Harmon is also the author of Business Process Change (3rd Ed) a popular business guide and school textbook for those interested in BPM.

Harmon recently rejoined Cutter Consortium as a Senior Consultant. He writes reports on current developments in Cognitive Computing and consults with Cutter Clients on integrating cognitive techniques into their existing business processes.

== See also ==
- Business process management
- Common Object Request Broker Architecture

== Publications ==
Paul Harmon published several books and articles. A selection:

- 1972. Accounting essentials. With Neal Margolis in consultation with Joseph Peter Simini.
- 1973. Climbing Routes on Yosemite's Walls.
- 1985. Expert systems : artificial intelligence in business . With David King.
- 1988. Expert systems : tools and applications. With William Morrissey.
- 1990. Creating expert systems for business and industry . With Brian Sawyer.
- 1990. ObjectVision : a graphical programming tool for object-oriented applications. With Brian Sawyer.
- 1991. ObjectCraft : a graphical programming tool for object-oriented applications. With Brian Sawyer.
- 1993. Objects in action : commercial applications of object-oriented technologies. With David A. Taylor and the assistance of William Morrissey
- 1993. Intelligent software systems development : an IS manager's guide. With Curtis Hall.
- 1996. Object technology casebook : lessons from award-winning business applications. With William Morrissey.
- 1998. Understanding UML : the developer's guide : with a Web-based application in Java. With Mark Watson.
- 1999. UML for Visual Basic 6.0 developers : using Visual Modeler and Rational Rose 98. With Brian Sawyer.
- 2001. Developing E-business systems & architectures : a manager's guide. With Michael Rosen and Michael Guttman.
- 2003. Business Process Change: A Manager's Guide to Improving, Redesigning, and Automating Processes.
- 2008. Business Process Change: A Guide for Business Managers and BPM and Six Sigma Professioinals.
- 2014. Business Process Change, Third Edition: A Business Process Management Guide for Managers and Process Professionals .
- 2019. Business Process Change, Fourth Edition: A Business Process Management Guide for Managers and Process Professioinals.
