= Gerrit Versteeg (enterprise architect) =

Gerrit Versteeg (born c. 1960) is a Dutch enterprise architect and management consultant, known for his work in defining the field of business architecture.

== Biography ==
Versteeg started his studies at the HTS Amsterdam in 1977, where he received his BA in Information Technology in 1981. During his career he received another BA in Business Informatics at the HEAO Utrecht in 1987, his MA in Strategic Management from the Rotterdam School of Management in 2000, and pursued his PhD research in Business Architecture at the Delft University of Technology from 2004 to 2007.

Versteeg started his career as Sales Consultant for the Holland Data Groep in 1983. In 1984 he joined Volmac, which was by Capgemini in 1992, as IT consultant. From 1986 to 1997 he also worked at the Postbank as Project Leader, and became Architect. In 1996 he joined the FourPoints Business Intelligence firm, that supplies IT services in the field of Data Warehousing, Business Intelligence and Marketing Solutions.

== Work ==
=== Business architecture ===
In the 2006 article "Business Architecture: A new paradigm to relate business strategy to ICT," Versteeg & Bouwman explained the essence of business architecture. They wrote:

We use the concept of 'Business Architecture’ to structure the responsibility over business activities prior to any further effort to structure individual aspects (processes, data, functions, organization, etc.). The business architecture arranges the responsibilities around the most important business activities (for instance production, distribution, marketing, et cetera) and/or economic activities (for instance manufacturing, assembly, transport, wholesale, et cetera) into domains

And furthermore:

The business architecture forms a significantly better basis for subsequent architectures than the separate statements themselves. The business architecture gives direction to organizational aspects, such as the organizational structuring (in which the responsibilities of the business domains are assigned to individuals/business units in the organization chart or where a new organization chart is drawn) and the administrative organization (describing for instance the financial reconciliation mechanisms between business domains). Assigning the various business domains to their owners (managers) also helps the further development of other architectures, because now the managers of these domains can be involved with a specific assigned responsibility. This led to increased involvement of top-level management, being domain-owners and well aware of their role. Detailed portions of business domains can be developed based on the effort and support of the domain-owners involved. Business architecture therefore is a very helpful pre-structuring device for the development, acceptance and implementation of subsequent architectures.

=== Business architecture and business strategy ===
About the relation between business architecture and business strategy, Versteeg & Bouwman wrote:

Business Architecture is directly based on business strategy. It is the foundation for subsequent architectures (strategy embedding), where it is detailed into various aspects and disciplines. The business strategy can consist of elements like strategy statements, organizational goals and objectives, generic and/or applied business models, etc. The strategic statements are analyzed and arranged hierarchically, through techniques like qualitative hierarchical cluster analysis. Based on this hierarchy the initial business architecture is further developed, using general organizational structuring methods and business administration theory, like theories on assets and resources and theories on structuring economic activity. Based on the business architecture the construction of the organization takes shape... During the strategy formulation phase and as a result of the design of the business architecture, the business strategy gets better formulated and understood as well as made more internally consistent.

Versteeg & Bouwman also stipulated, that "the perspectives for subsequent design next to organization are more common: information architecture, technical architecture, process architecture. The various parts (functions, concepts and processes) of the business architecture act as a compulsory starting point for the different subsequent architectures. It pre-structures other architectures. Business architecture models shed light on the scantly elaborated relationships between business strategy and business design. We will illustrate the value of business architecture in a case study."

== Selected publications ==
- Versteeg, Gerrit, and Antonet Hoorneman-van Gestel. "Entry on an Increasing Returns Market: Influencing Entry Factors for an Established Player derived from Market Dynamics." Presented to the PLACE 2 project at its Research Symposium, April 20 th, 2001 Münster, Germany.
- Versteeg, Gerrit, and Harry Bouwman. "Business Architecture: A New Approach to Improving a Corporation's Adaptability to Strategic Change." (2005).
- Versteeg, Gerrit, and Harry Bouwman. "Business architecture: A new paradigm to relate business strategy to ICT." Information Systems Frontiers 8.2 (2006): 91–102.
- Bouwman, H., van Houtum, H., Janssen, M., & Versteeg, G. (2011). "Business architectures in the public sector: experiences from practice." Communications of the Association for Information Systems, 29(1), 411–426.
