= Association for Supply Chain Management =

Not-for-profit international education organization

- Association for Supply Chain Management
- Abbreviation: ASCM
- Formation: 1957; 69 years ago
- Type: 501(c)(6) non-profit
- Tax ID no.: 36-6066976 exempt
- Purpose: Fostering the advancement of end-to-end supply chain management.
- Headquarters: Chicago, US
- CEO: Abe Eshkenazi
- Chair of the Board of Directors: Pamela Dow
- Main organ: SCM Now magazine
- Revenue: $32M (2022)
- Website: www.ascm.org
- Formerly called: American Production and Inventory Control Society (APICS)

The Association for Supply Chain Management (ASCM) is a not-for-profit international educational organization offering certification programs, training tools, and networking opportunities to increase workplace performance. Formed in 1957, it was originally known as the "American Production and Inventory Control Society" or APICS. The mission of the organization is to advance end-to-end supply chain management. APICS merged with the Supply Chain Council in 2014, and the American Society of Transportation and Logistics in 2015. In 2018, APICS renamed itself ASCM.

== History ==
Historical APICS logo

In 1957, 27 production and inventory control managers in Cleveland, Ohio formed the American Production and Inventory Control Society (APICS). The organization held its first conference in Cleveland, Ohio in 1958. It became an international association with its first Canadian attendees in 1961 and chartered the Hamilton, Ontario, Canada chapter that same year. In 1969, APICS had 47 chapter affiliations in cities in the United States and Canada.

The Supply Chain Council (SCC) merged into APICS on 5 August 2014. APICS also merged with the American Society of Transportation and Logistics (AST&L) in 2015. The organization renamed itself the Association for Supply Chain Management (ASCM) in 2018 but retains APICS as a brand within the organization.

=== The historical Supply Chain Council ===
The Supply Chain Council (SCC) was formed in 1996 as an independent non-profit organization by industry research firm AMR Research (AMR) and consulting firm Pitiglio, Rabin, Todd and McGrath (PRTM), with membership made up of a variety of industries, including manufacturing, service, distribution, and retailing. (Note: The SCC's name was also shown as "Supply-Chain Council" in early publications.) The council's original mission was to define a common language to describe and model supply chains. SCC developed the Supply Chain Operations Reference (SCOR) model for supply chain management. The original framework for the SCOR model was developed by AMR and PRTM and vetted with industry-leading companies including Intel, IBM, Rockwell Semiconductor, and Procter and Gamble. The original model was designed to describe supply chains in four basic processes: Plan, Source, Make, and Deliver. The Return process was added later to accommodate remanufacturing industries and e-commerce. The Enable process was added last to support managing and improving various aspects of supply chain operations.

== Certifications ==
ASCM offers several professional designations: CPIM, CSCP, CLTD, and CTSC. Additional certificate programs have been created, including the Supply Chain Procurement Certificate, the Supply Chain Warehousing Certificate, the Supply Chain Planning Certificate, the Supply Chain Technology Certificate, and the Supply Chain Resilience Certificate.

=== CPIM ===
The APICS Certified in Production and Inventory Management, or APICS CPIM, designation is a professional certification offered by ASCM. The program was founded in 1973. Since its inception, more than 100,000 people have earned the APICS CPIM designation. APICS CPIM designees learn terminology, concepts, and strategies related to demand management, procurement and supplier planning, material requirements planning, capacity requirements planning, sales and operations planning, master scheduling, performance measurements, supplier relationships, quality control, and continuous improvement.

ASCM now offers the APICS Certified in Planning and Inventory Management (CPIM) designation, which places a greater focus on planning than production.

=== CSCP ===
The APICS Certified Supply Chain Professional, or APICS CSCP, designation demonstrates professional knowledge and organizational skills for developing more streamlined operations. Since its launch in 2006, more than 30,000 professionals in 100 countries have earned the CSCP designation.

=== CLTD ===
The APICS Certified in Logistics, Transportation and Distribution, or APICS CLTD, designation demonstrates in-depth knowledge of a range of supply chain logistics topics. More than 1,000 professionals have earned their CLTDs since the program launched in 2016.

=== CTSC ===
The APICS Certified in Transformation for Supply Chain, or CTSC, program leverages components of globally recognized industry standards, including the ASCM SCOR Digital Standard (DS), Enterprise Standards for Sustainability, and the Digital Capabilities Model (DCM) to help individuals transform their organization's supply chain

=== SRM ===
The Supplier Relationship Management (SRM) certificate program is self-paced and offers several trainings from supplier relationship management to propelling continuous movement through the supply chain. The program is geared towards all levels of professionals working in the management of supply chain and procurement.

== Publications ==
ASCM has moved to a digital content publishing strategy. Published articles can be found on ASCM.org or as part of a members-only benefit through its online Supply Chain Knowledge Center platform.

ASCM also owns the Journal of Operations Management and the Transportation Journal, published through Wiley Publishing.

ASCM also publishes the Supply Chain Dictionary. The 17th edition includes 5,328 terms and definitions, 483 of which are new terms compiled by industry.

SCM Now was previously the official print publication of the organization which was also formerly called APICS magazine.
