= Supply chain operations reference =

Process reference model

The Supply Chain Operations Reference (SCOR) model is a process reference model originally developed and endorsed by the Supply Chain Council, now a part of ASCM, as the cross-industry, standard diagnostic tool for supply chain management. The SCOR model describes the business activities associated with satisfying a customer's demand, which include plan, source, make, deliver, return, and enable. Use of the model includes analyzing the current state of a company's processes and goals, quantifying operational performance, and comparing company performance to benchmark data. SCOR has developed a set of metrics for supply chain performance, and ASCM members have formed industry groups to collect best practices information that companies can use to elevate their supply chain models.

This reference model enables users to address, improve, and communicate supply chain management practices within and between all interested parties in the extended enterprise.

SCOR was developed in 1996 by the management consulting firm PRTM, now part of PricewaterhouseCoopers LLP (PwC), and AMR Research, now part of Gartner, and endorsed by the Supply Chain Council, now part of ASCM, as the cross-industry de facto standard strategy, performance management, and process improvement diagnostic tool for supply chain management.

== SCOR DS ==
The SCOR Digital Standard (DS) was released in 2019 and updated in 2022 to digitize the model to make it more accessible and then to better describe dynamic, asynchronous digital supply chains, rather than the linear system presented by previous versions of the model. The 2022 update restructured the six major processes into the following processes:

- Plan.
- Source.
- Transform — essentially an expanded version of Make that applies to more types of manufacturers and service providers.
- Order — the first part of the previously-combined Deliver process.
- Fulfill — the second part of the previously-combined Deliver process.
- Return.
- Orchestrate — a new focus on strategy, business rules, technology and human resources and their roles in supporting efficient supply chains.

This new version of the model is illustrated as a type of infinity loop which reflects the modern reality of supply chain networks, rather than linear supply chains, and with "no artificial starts or stops from process to process". SCOR DS puts greater emphasis on collaboration, visibility and the effects of market drivers. The SCOR DS model is currently available free of charge.

== SCOR 1.0 - 12.0 Pillars ==
The original version of the SCOR model was based on four major pillars:

- Process modeling and re-engineering.
- Performance measurements.
- Best practices.
- Skills.

=== Process modeling ===
By describing supply chains using process modeling building blocks, the model can be used to describe supply chains that are very simple or very complex using a common set of definitions. As a result, disparate industries can be linked to describe the depth and breadth of virtually any supply chain.

SCOR model 12.0 was based on six distinct management processes: Plan, Source, Make, Deliver, Return, and Enable.

- Plan – Processes that balance aggregate demand and supply to develop a course of action that best meets sourcing, production, and delivery requirements.
- Source – Processes that procure goods and services to meet planned or actual demand.
- Make – Processes that transform product to a finished state to meet planned or actual demand.
- Deliver – Processes that provide finished goods and services to meet planned or actual demand, typically including order management, transportation management, and distribution management.
- Return – Processes associated with returning or receiving returned products for any reason. These processes extend into post-delivery customer support.
- Enable – Processes being associated with the management of the supply chain. These processes include management of business rules, performance, data, resources, facilities, contracts, supply chain network management, managing regulatory compliance, and risk management. The process is implemented in Version 11.0, released in December 2012.

With all reference models, there is a specific scope that the model addresses. SCOR is no different, and the model focuses on the following:

- All customer interactions, from order entry through paid invoice.
- All product (physical material and service) transactions, from your supplier's supplier to your customer's customer, including equipment, supplies, spare parts, bulk product, software, etc.
- All market interactions, from the understanding of aggregate demand to the fulfillment of each order.

SCOR does not attempt to describe every business process or activity. Relationships between these processes can be made to the SCOR model and some have been noted within the model. Other key assumptions addressed by SCOR include training, quality, information technology, and administration (not supply chain management). These areas are not explicitly addressed in the model but rather assumed to be a fundamental supporting process throughout the model.

SCOR provides three-levels of process detail. Each level of detail assists a company in defining scope (Level 1); configuration or type of supply chain (Level 2); and process element details, including performance attributes (Level 3). Beyond level 3, companies decompose process elements and start implementing specific supply chain management practices. It is at this stage that companies define practices to achieve a competitive advantage, and adapt to changing business conditions.

SCOR is a process reference model designed for effective communication among supply chain partners. As an industry standard, it also facilitates inter- and intra- supply chain collaboration and horizontal process integration by explaining the relationships between processes (i.e., Plan-Source, Plan-Make, etc.). It also can be used as a data input to completing an analysis of configuration alternatives (e.g., Level 2) such as: Make-to-Stock or Make-To-Order. SCOR is used to describe, measure, and evaluate supply chains in support of strategic planning and continuous improvement.

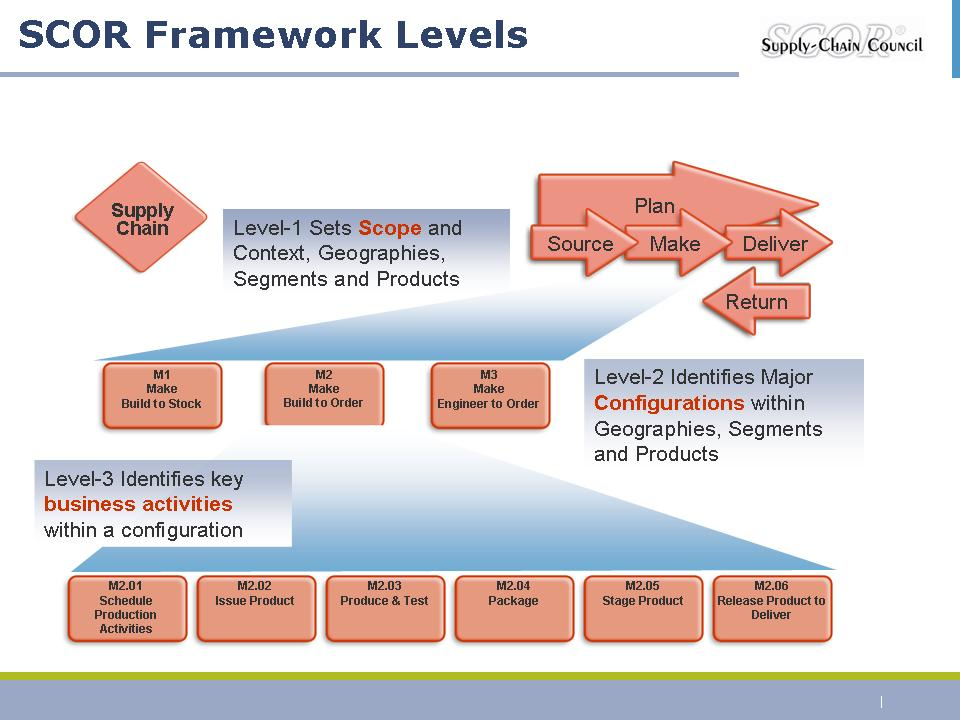
SCOR Process Framework

The picture shows different levels of the Make process. This means that the focus of the analysis will be concentrated on those processes that relate to the added-value activities that the model categorizes as Make processes.

Level 2 includes 3 sub-processes that are children of the Make parent. These children have a special tag: a letter (M) and a number (1, 2, or 3). This is the syntax of the SCOR model. The letter represents the initial of the process. The numbers identify the scenario, or configuration.

M1 equals a "Make Build to Stock" scenario. Products or services are produced against a forecast. M2 equals a "Make Build to Order" configuration. Products or services are produced against a real customer order in a just-in-time fashion. M3 stands for the "Make Engineer to Order" configuration. In this case a blueprint of the final product is needed before any make activity can be performed.

Level 3 processes, also referred to as the business activities within a configuration, represent the best-practice detailed processes that belong to each of the Level 2 parents.

The example shows the breakdown of the Level 2 process "Make Build to Order" into its Level 3 components identified from M2.01 to M2.06. Once again this is the SCOR syntax: letter, number, dot, and serial number.

The model suggests that to perform a "Make Build to Order" process, there are 6 more detailed tasks that are usually performed. The model is not prescriptive, in the sense that it is not mandatory that all 6 processes are to be executed. It only represents what usually happens in the majority of organizations that compose the membership base of ASCM.

The Level 3 processes reach a level of detail that cannot exceed the boundaries determined by the industry-agnostic and industry-standard nature of the SCOR model. Therefore, all the set of activities and processes that build, for instance the M2.03 "Produce & Test" process, will be company-specific and therefore fall outside the model's scope.

=== Performance measurements ===
The SCOR model contains more than 150 key performance indicators that measure the performance of supply chain operations. These performance metrics derive from the experience and contribution of the association's members. As with the process modeling system, SCOR metrics are organized in a hierarchical structure:

- Level 1 metrics are at the most aggregated level and are typically used by top decision-makers to measure the performance of the company's overall supply chain.
- Level 2 metrics are primary, high-level measures that may cross multiple SCOR processes.
- Level 3 metrics do not necessarily relate to the SCOR Level 1 processes: Plan, Source, Make, Deliver, Return and Enable.

The metrics are used in conjunction with performance attributes. The performance attributes are characteristics of the supply chain that permit it to be analyzed and evaluated against other supply chains with competing strategies. Just as you would describe a physical object like a piece of lumber using standard characteristics (e.g., height, width, depth), a supply chain requires standard characteristics to be described. Without these characteristics it is extremely difficult to compare an organization that chooses to be the low-cost provider against an organization that chooses to compete on reliability and performance.

One of the key aspects that needs to be considered is that the performance measurement and thus benchmarking is done at supply chain level and not at the organizational level. Supply chains are identified with an organization based on customers and products. An organization that is offering multiple products will have multiple supply chains. In fact the supply chain to deliver the material and then return the material from customers will also be different.

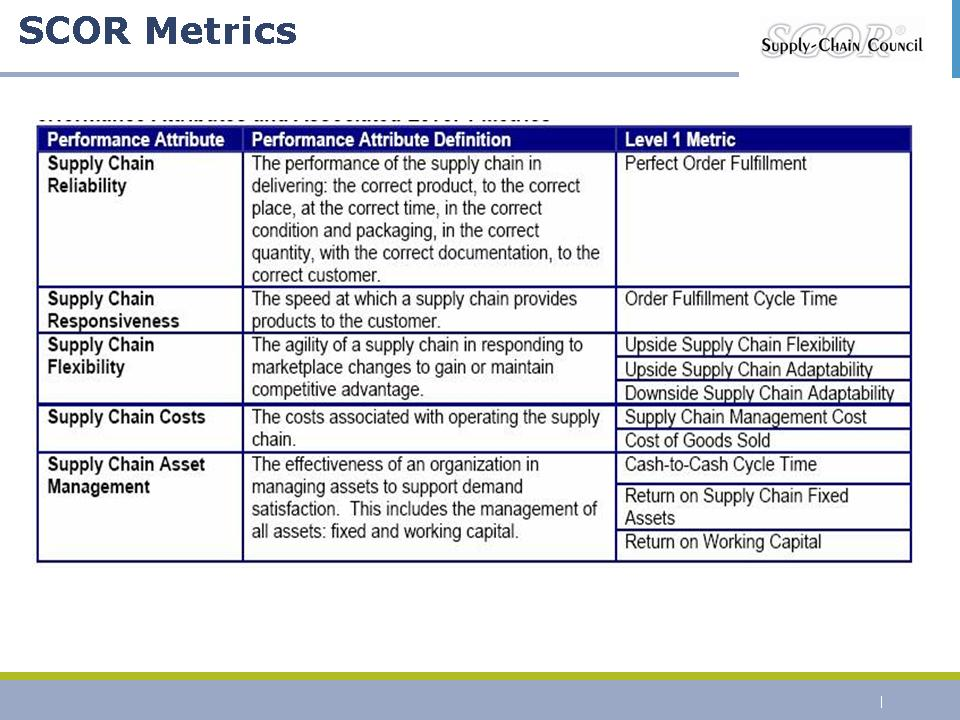
SCOR Performance Attributes and Level 1 Metrics

Then the supply chain that needs to be improved is identified. This could be based on multiple parameters, such as most or least profitable. Once the supply chain is identified, then only the performance measurement and benchmarking are done. Please note SCOR might not have the benchmarking data for all kinds of supply chains. For example, SCOR currently doesn't have data for the catering supply chain in the airline industry. The point here is that SCOR is for improving supply chains in an organization, and the premise is that if a single supply chain is improved, it has ripple effects on the whole organization.

Associated with the performance attributes are the Level 1 metrics. These Level 1 metrics are the calculations by which an implementing organization can measure how successful they are in achieving their desired positioning within the competitive market space.

The metrics in the model are hierarchical, just as the process elements are hierarchical. Level 1 metrics are created from lower-level calculations. (Level 1 metrics are primary, high-level measures that may cross multiple SCOR processes. Level 1 metrics do not necessarily relate to a SCOR Level 1 process (Plan, Source, Make, Deliver, Return, or Enable). Lower-level calculations (Level 2 metrics) are generally associated with a narrower subset of processes. For example, Delivery Performance is calculated as the total number of products delivered on time and in full based on a commit date.

=== Best practices ===
Once the performance of the supply chain operations has been measured and performance gaps identified, it becomes important to identify what activities should be performed to close those gaps. More than 430 executable practices derived from the experience of association members are available.

The SCOR model defines a best practice as a current, structured, proven and repeatable method for making a positive impact on desired operational results.

- Current – Must not be emerging (bleeding edge) and must not be antiquated.
- Structured – Has a clearly stated goal, scope, process, and procedure.
- Proven – Shows demonstrated success in a working environment.
- Repeatable – Has been proven in multiple environments.
- Method – Is used in a very broad sense to indicate a business process, a practice, an organizational strategy, an enabling technology, a business relationship, a business model, as well as information or knowledge management.

Positive impact on desired operational results

The practice shows operational improvement related to the stated goal and could be linked to key metric(s). The impact should show either as gain (increase in speed, revenues, quality) or reduction (resource utilizations, costs, loss, returns, etc.).

== Use example based on SCOR 1.0 to SCOR 12.0 ==
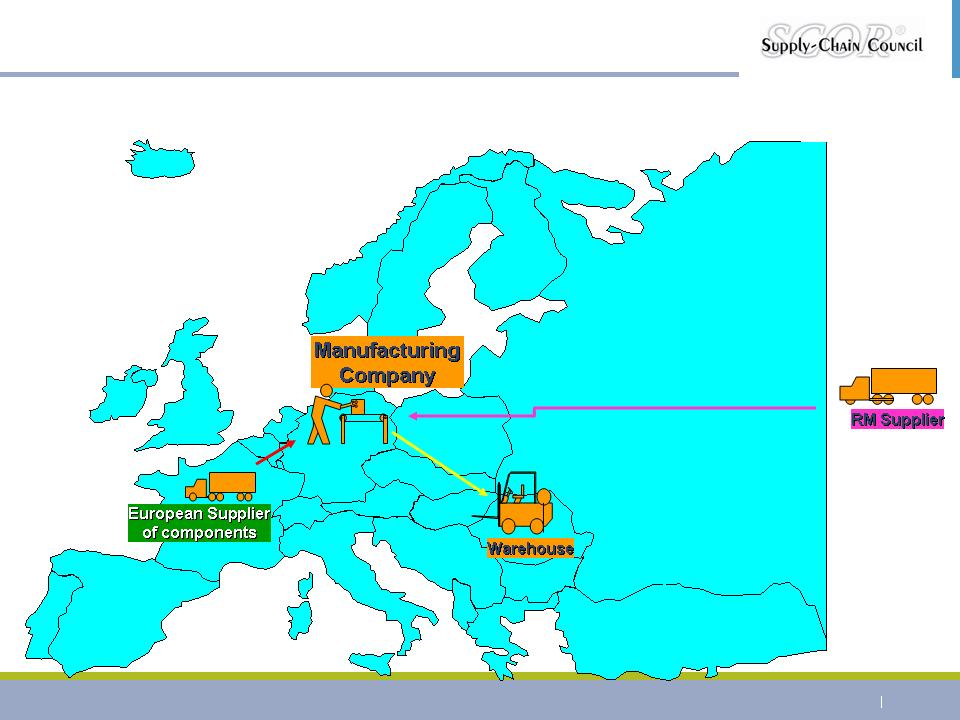
Example of supply chain

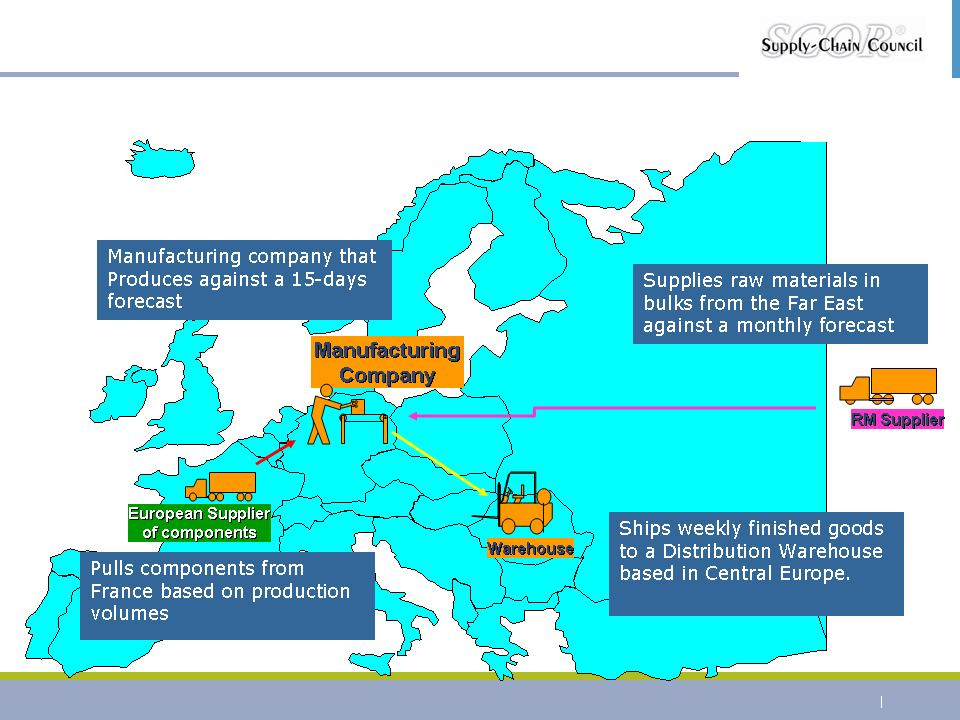
Some additional descriptions for the supply chain

SCOR improves on this by offering a "standard" solution. The first step is to recover the Level 1 and Level 2 process descriptions.

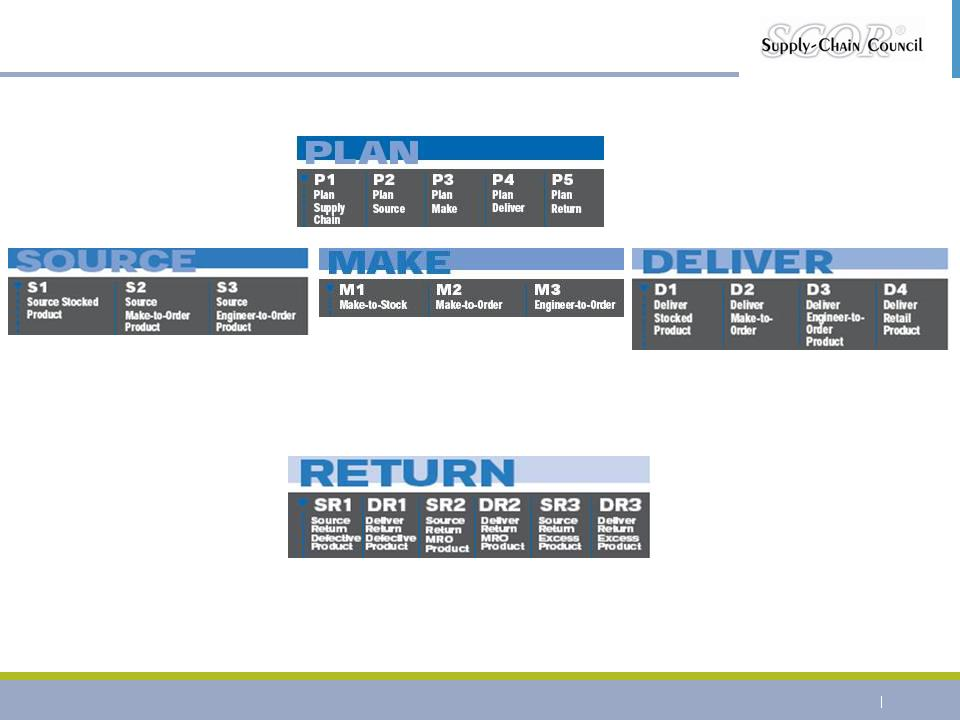
Caption from SCOR 8.0

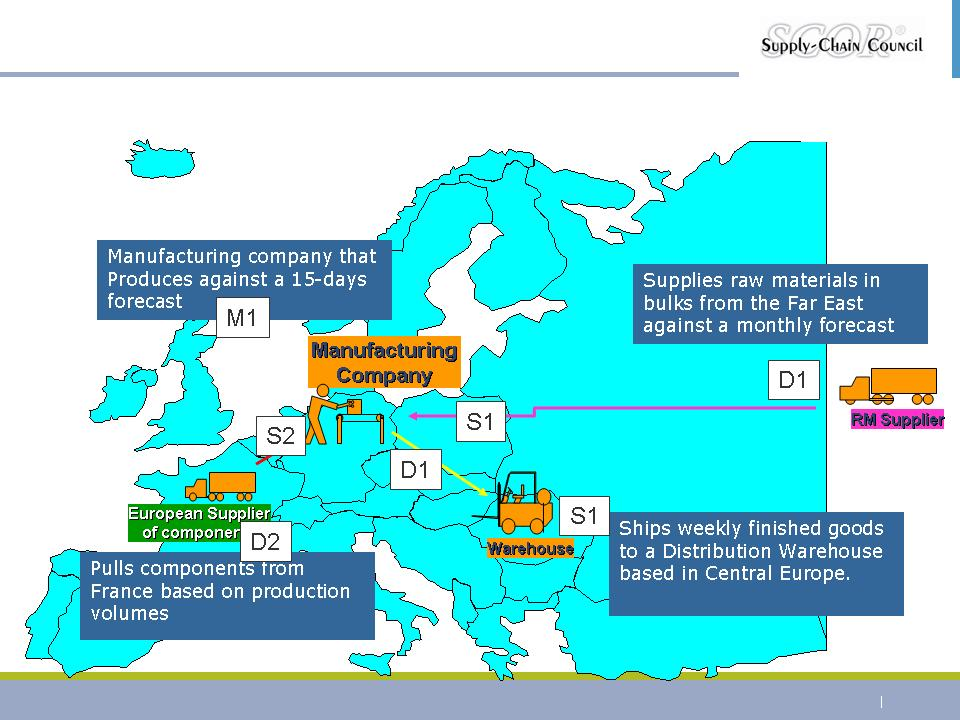
Completed mappings of the supply chain processes with SCOR

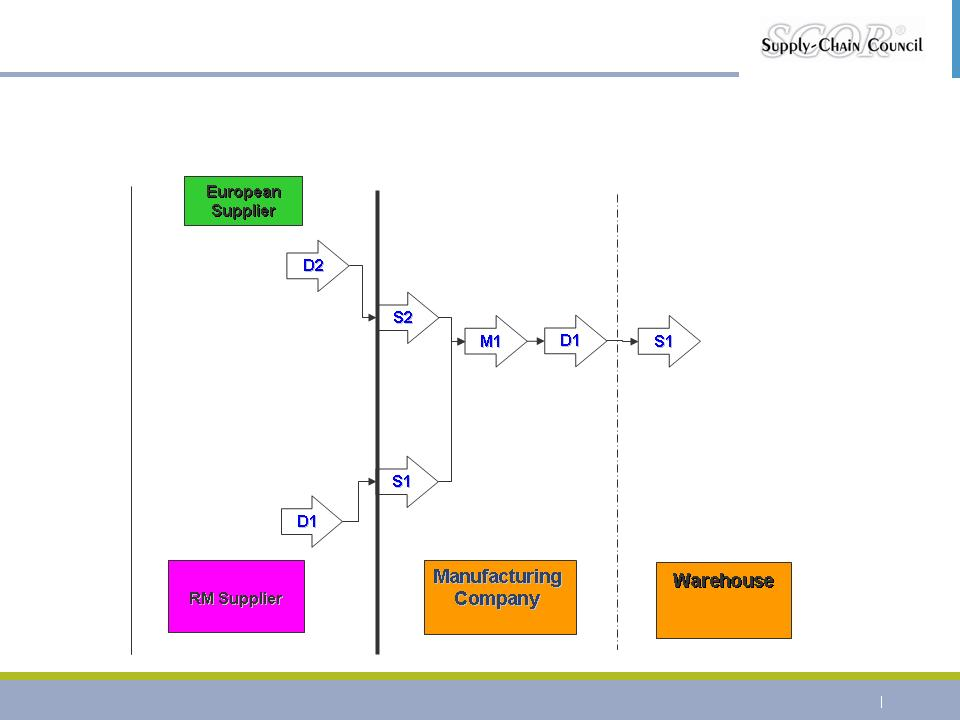
SCOR thread diagram

The example is of a simple supply chain.

The picture alone cannot adequately describe what production strategy the manufacturing company has decided to adopt. It is no easier to figure out how the material is supplied from the two suppliers. For example, is the material delivered against a forecast or is it pulled based on real consumption?

Even in its apparent simplicity, this picture does not represent a standard. Without a more extensive description, the picture does not help interpret what is actually happening in this supply chain. Descriptive text could be added to the images to help explain the whole process. In order to keep the example simple and direct, it focuses only on the central processes: Source, Make, and Deliver. This reflects the general practice of members who focus first of all on these three process scopes. Only in a second step do they apply Plan and Return to map all their supply chain processes.

The example is of a manufacturing company that produces against a 15-day forecast. The key word here is forecast. What is the SCOR scenario that resembles a production based on a forecast? The answer is, M1 "Make Build to Stock".

How does the company supply materials from the Far East? The diagram explains that the company supplies raw materials in bulk from the Far East against a monthly forecast. Forecast is again the key word. How should a process of supply based on a forecast be represented? The process is Source. The picture from the SCOR manual shows that the process S1 “Source Stocked Product” exactly corresponds to the needs of this example.

With the French supplier, the company pulls components from France based on production volumes. The key word here is pulls, as it describes a just-in-time strategy adopted with this supplier. What is the syntax used by SCOR to represent a pull-mode supply? The Source process descriptions in SCOR 12.0 offers a description that resonates well with the needs of the example: S2 “Source Make-to-Order Product”.

Lastly, the distribution strategy chosen by the manufacturing company is to ship weekly finished goods to a distribution warehouse based in Central Europe. The description suggests that a weekly shipment is closer to a forecast-based rather than a just-in-time policy. A shipment is a delivery process, so we must look under the Deliver tree. By browsing the Level 2 processes in the model, we must look for a process configuration that corresponds to the forecast-based policy. We find that in D1 “Deliver Stocked Product.”

The SCOR paradigm demands that whenever a unit of the supply chain sources, there must be some other unit that delivers. Similarly, any delivery process requires a corresponding sourcing process at the other end of the link. So the mapping of the processes of the supply chain is completed, and can be depicted as in the following illustration.

We see now that we don't need any more the descriptions in the boxes. By just reading the SCOR syntax we immediately capture the salient processes that occur in this chain.

The syntax of the model allows professionals to speak the same language. As a matter of fact, if we were to use the “orthodox” representation of a SCOR mapping, we would build a thread diagram like the one in the below picture. This is perfectly correspondent to the initial geographical picture, but it contains much more embedded information (we can call it a meta-model) in a more structured and elegant way. The arrows themselves represent the direction of the material flow.

== Supply chain modeling ==
The implementation of the SCOR model helps with the utilization of the supply chain model. Companies usually integrate SCOR into their existing practices, which helps them reach their business goals and optimize their activities.

A project that includes the SCOR model is usually built in these steps:

- Understanding of the scope - configuration, performance, opportunity.
- Investigation of causes - problem discovery, classification of challenges.
- Identification of solutions - research and development of alternative solutions.
- Design of solutions - documentation (processes, organizational design, work instructions, etc.).
- Launch of the project - definition of the project, critical path, and project portfolio.

== People ==
The People section includes a standard that is used for description of skills that are required to perform a specific task and to manage those processes. In general, these skills are specific to the supply chain, where some can be found as applicable outside the supply chain field as well.

Skills are defined by Trainings, Experiences, Aptitudes, and Competency level. The latter is further divided into five widely accepted competency levels: Novice, beginner, competent, proficient, and expert.

- Novice: Unqualified beginner without past experience, requires detailed documentation.
- Beginner: Able to perform the tasks, limited situational perception present.
- Competent: Understanding of tasks, able to define priorities to successfully finish the task.
- Proficient: Able to oversee the main aspects of the task, advanced situational perception.
- Expert: Able to apply patterns from experience into new situations.

The competency levels are most commonly used as practice or process maturity levels. In addition, the job specification or a person is evaluated as the difference between the real (people) and planned (job specification) level of competency.
