= Jaap Schekkerman =

Dutch computer scientist

Jaap Schekkerman (born 1953) is a Dutch computer scientist and founder of the Institute For Enterprise Architecture Developments (IFEAD) in the Netherlands. He is particularly known for his 2003 book How to Survive in the Jungle of Enterprise Architecture in which he compared 14 Enterprise Architecture Frameworks.

== Biography ==
Schekkerman received a degree in clinical chemistry from the Bakhuis Roozeboom Instituut in Beverwijk in 1973, and his Engineer's degree in electronic engineering from the HTS Amsterdam in 1979. Further on he received a certificates in information technology from AMBI in 1984, and a certificates in business economics from the Open University in the Netherlands in 1988.

Schekkerman started working as assistant scientist at the Free University Amsterdam in 1973. The next year he started working at the Red Cross Hospital in Beverwijk, where he became chief information officer and participated in the development of medical information technology. From 1985 to 1989 he managed the IT Research & Development department of the insurance company Centraal Beheer, and in 1989 became IT consultant at the Dutch Software developer RAET. From 1995 till 2005 he was business and Information Technology consultant for Capgemini, from 2005 till 2008 Business Technology Strategy & Enterprise Architecture consultant for Verdonck, Klooster & Associates in the Netherlands, and from 2008 till 2012 management consultant for Logica, and lecturer at the Delft TopTech Program of the Technical University Delft. From 2012 till 2016 Jaap Schekkerman was Global Director Cyber Protection & Resilience at CGI, a Canadian IT & Security Firm responsible for Worldwide Cyber Protection & Resilience in Industrial Control Systems. His main focus was helping Global Industrial, Pharmaceutical & Energy Companies in defining their Cyber & Physical Protectection & Resilience Architecture as a foundation for further implementations.

In 1982 Schekkerman received the American Ames Award for his article about future medical information technology development. In 2001 he founded the Institute For Enterprise Architecture Developments (IFEAD) in the Netherlands.

In 2012 Schekkerman became Global Director Cyber Security at CGI (Canada) where he was responsible for Cyber Security of Industrial Control Systems at companies worldwide.

In 2013 Schekkerman is awarded with the International Global Excellence iCMG Hall of Fame Award for his 20 years contribution to the Enterprise and Security Architecture Profession at the Architecture World Summit 2013, India.

In 2015 Schekkerman was one the leading founders of the Cyber Research Center - Industrial Control Systems, a cyber research center focused on Cyber Protection & Resilience of Industrial Control Systems. Cyber Protection & Resilience are the Only Drivers for Successful Architecture Today

In 2018 Schekkerman stopped his activities at the Cyber Research Center - Industrial Control Systems for personal reasons. and the Extended Enterprise Architecture Maturity Model.

== Work ==
=== Institute For Enterprise Architecture Developments ===
In 2001 Schekkerman founded the Institute For Enterprise Architecture Developments (IFEAD). for research in and knowledge exchange about the emerging field of Enterprise Architecture.

The institute works together with a series of institutes in the field and facilitated a series of publications in the field of Enterprise Architecture.

=== How to Survive in the Jungle of Enterprise Architecture Frameworks ===
In his 2003 book "How to Survive in the Jungle of Enterprise Architecture Frameworks" Schekkerman defined enterprise architecture as:

Enterprise Architecture is a complete expression of the enterprise; a master plan which "acts as a collaboration force" between aspects of business planning such as goals, visions, strategies and governance principles; aspects of business operations such as business terms, organization structures, processes and data; aspects of automation such as information systems and databases; and the enabling technological infrastructure of the business, such as computers, operating systems and networks.

Schekkerman had witnessed a growing importance of Enterprise Architecture. He explained:

Recent Surveys of CEO’s, CIO’s and other executives provide some evidence of the growing importance of Enterprise Architecture over the last few years. In one of the most recent studies of the Institute For Enterprise Architecture Developments (IFEAD), Enterprise Architecture was ranked near the top of the list of most important issues considered by CEO’s and CIO’s.

Apparently, this suggests the significance of the overarching framework within which the various aspects of decision-making and development are considered: including Business Architecture, Information Architecture, Information-Systems Architecture (Data Architecture), Technology Infrastructure Architecture and things like Software Architecture.

The various decisions related to business development and technology innovations need to be considered in a systemic manner within the framework of various architectures. Choices of methods and techniques have to be made in the context of the goals and objectives...

=== Enterprise Architecture Frameworks ===
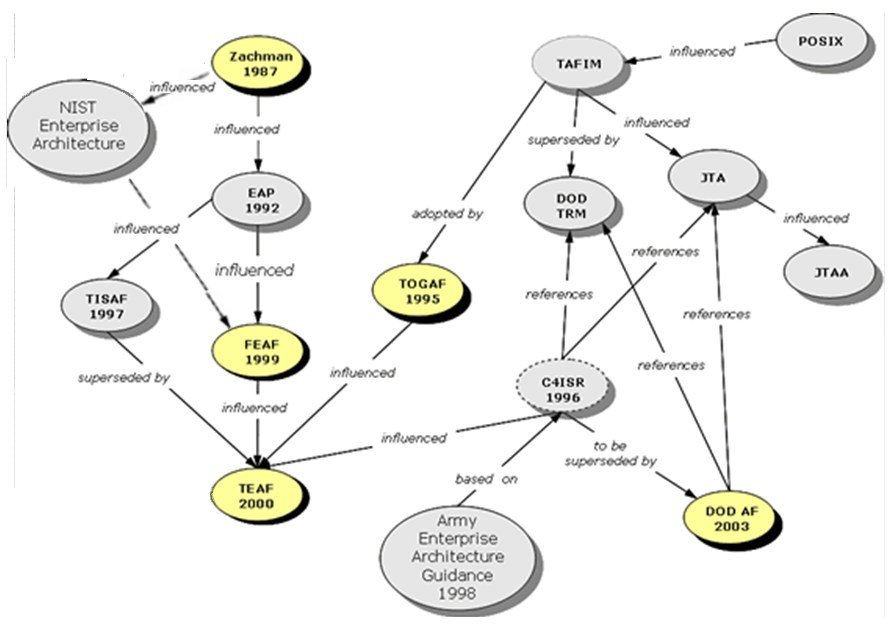
Overview of Enterprise Architecture Frameworks evolution (1987–2003), based on Schekkerman (2004).

The "How to Survive in the Jungle of Enterprise Architecture Frameworks" started with a general introduction of the principles of enterprise architecture and the EA practice in the US and in Europe. Subsequently, this book compares 14 of the most popular Enterprise Architecture Frameworks of that time.

Starting with the Extended Enterprise Architecture Framework (E2AF) it describes Enterprise Architecture Planning (EAP), The Federal Enterprise Architecture Framework (FEAF), the Treasury Enterprise Architecture Framework (TEAF), The Open Group Architecture Framework (TOGAF), the Zachman Framework, the Integrated Architecture Framework (IAF), the Joint Technical Architecture (JTA), the C4ISR and DoDAF, the Department of Defense Technical Reference Model (DoD TRM), and finished with the reference architecture TAFIM, CIMOSA, PERA en the SAGA - Standards and Architectures for e-Government Applications.

=== Extended Enterprise Architecture Framework ===
Early 2000s Schekkerman developed the Extended Enterprise Architecture (E2A) and Extended Enterprise Architecture Framework (E2AF). The Extended Enterprise Architecture (E2A) is designed to address three different elements in a comprehensive way:

- The element of construction,
- the element of function, and
- the element of style

According to Schekkerman (2007) in enterprise architecture "style is reflecting the culture, values, norms and principles of an organization. Most of the time, the term enterprise architecture is dealing with construction and function, without any attention of the style aspect, while the style aspect reflects the cultural behavior, values, norms and principles of that organization in such a way that it reflects the corporate values of that organization."

The Extended Enterprise Architecture Framework (E2AF), first published in 2003, is based on the IEEE 1471 Standard for describing the architecture of a software-intensive system regarding views and viewpoints, and other elements from FEAF and TOGAF. It uses a 2-D matrix structure, similar to the Zachman Framework, and defines four types of scopes: business, information, system, and infrastructure. However, overall in comparison to the Zachman Framework the E2AF is more technology-oriented.

== Publications ==
Schekkerman published more than 100+ articles and several books on Enterprise Architecture and related subjects. Schekkerman also contributed as author to several other Books and Publications. A selection:

- 2001. Book: Architectuur, besturingsinstrument voor adaptieve organisaties. With Daan Rijsenbrij and H. Hendrickx
- 2003. Book: How to Survive in the Jungle of Enterprise Architecture Frameworks: Creating or choosing an enterprise architecture framework . (2nd ed. Trafford Publishing USA.)
- 2005. Book: The Economic Benefits of Enterprise Architecture: How to Quantify and Manage the Economic Value of Enterprise Architecture. Trafford on Demand Pub, USA.
- 2008. Book: Enterprise Architecture Good Practices Guide. Trafford Publishing USA..
- 2009. Book: How to manage the enterprise architecture practice. Trafford Publishing USA.
- 2011. Enterprise Architecture Tool Selection Guide version 6.3 i. Institute For Enterprise Architecture Developments.
