= Enterprise information security architecture =

Enterprise information security architecture (EISA) is the practice of designing, constructing and maintaining information security strategies and policies in enterprise organisations. A subset of enterprise architecture, information security frameworks are often given their own dedicated resources in larger organisations and are therefore significantly more complex and robust than in small and medium-sized enterprises.

== Overview ==
Enterprise information security architecture is becoming a common practice within financial institutions around the globe. The primary purpose of creating an enterprise information security architecture is to ensure that business strategy and IT security are aligned.

== Enterprise information security architecture topics ==
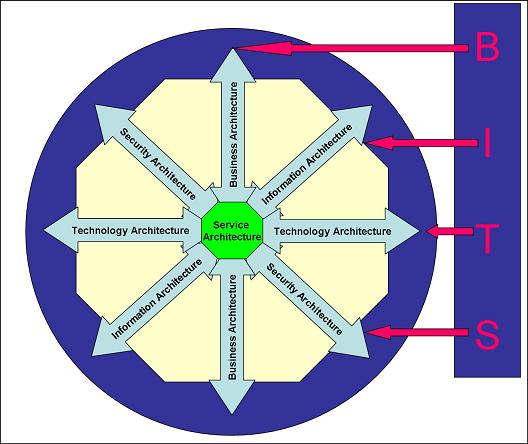

Enterprise information security architecture was first formally positioned by Gartner in their whitepaper called “Incorporating Security into the Enterprise Architecture Process”.

== High-level security architecture framework ==
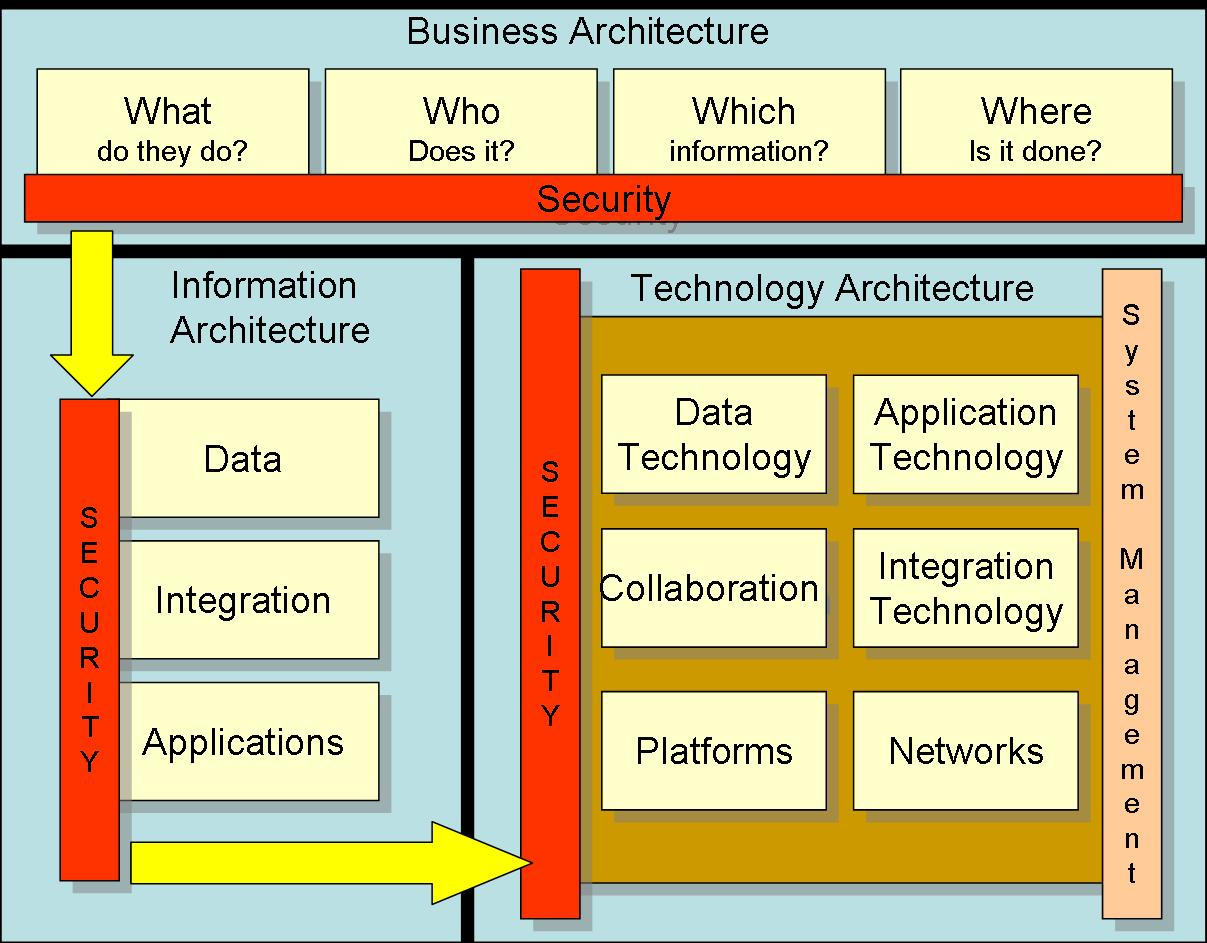
Huxham Security Framework

Whilst security architecture frameworks are often custom designed in enterprise organisations, several models are commonly used and adapted to the individual requirements of the organisation

Commonly used frameworks include:

- SABSA framework and methodology
- The U.S. Department of Defense (DoD) Architecture Framework (DoDAF)
- Extended Enterprise Architecture Framework (E2AF) from the Institute For Enterprise Architecture Developments.
- Federal Enterprise Architecture of the United States Government (FEA)
- The UK Ministry of Defence (MOD) Architecture Framework (MODAF)
- Service-Oriented Modeling Framework (SOMF)
- The Open Group Architecture Framework (TOGAF)
- Zachman Framework

== See also ==
- Enterprise architecture
- Enterprise architecture planning
- Information security
- Information assurance
