= EAF =

EAF may refer to:

== Military ==
- Egyptian Air Force
- Estonian Air Force
- Ethiopian Air Force
- East Africa Forces, in the compendium of postage stamp issuers

== Other uses ==
- EAF family of proteins
- Earagail Arts Festival, in County Donegal, Ireland
- East African Federation, the proposed successor to the East African Community
- East Asia Forum
- Electric arc furnace
- Enterprise architecture framework
- Estonian Archery Federation
- Ethiopian Athletic Federation
- European Aviation Air Charter, a defunct British airline
- European Alliance for Freedom, a defunct European political party
- Experimental Art Foundation, group of artists in Adelaide, South Australia, from the 1970s, later ACE Open
- SAP Enterprise Architecture Framework
