= Open systems architecture =

System design objective

Open systems architecture is a system design approach which aims to produce systems that are inherently interoperable and connectable without recourse to retrofit and redesign.

== Concept ==
Systems design is a process of defining and engineering the architecture, methods, and interfaces necessary to accomplish a goal or fulfill a set of requirements. In open systems architecture, the design includes intentional provisions to make it possible to expand or modify the system at a later stage after initial operation. There is no one specific universal OSA, but it is essential the specific OSA applicable to a system is rigorously defined and documented. For example, in information technology and telecommunication, such design principles lead to open systems.

== Telecommunications ==
In telecommunications, open systems architecture (OSA) is a standard that describes the layered hierarchical structure, configuration, or model of a communications or distributed data processing system. It enables system description, design, development, installation, operation, improvement, and maintenance to be performed at the abstraction layers in the hierarchical structure. Each layer provides a set of accessible functions that can be controlled and used by the functions in the layer above it. Each layer can be implemented without affecting the implementation of other layers. The alteration of system performance by the modification of one or more layers may be accomplished without altering the existing equipment, procedures, and protocols at the remaining layers.

Examples of independent alterations include the conversion from wire to optical fiber at a physical layer without affecting the data link layer or the network layer, except to provide more traffic capacity, and the altering of the operational protocols at the network level without altering the physical layer.

== See also ==
- Hardware Open Systems Technologies
- Architecture of Interoperable Information Systems
- Architectural pattern
- Enterprise architecture
- OSI model
- Open-system environment reference model
