= Daniel Akenine =

Swedish IT architect and researcher

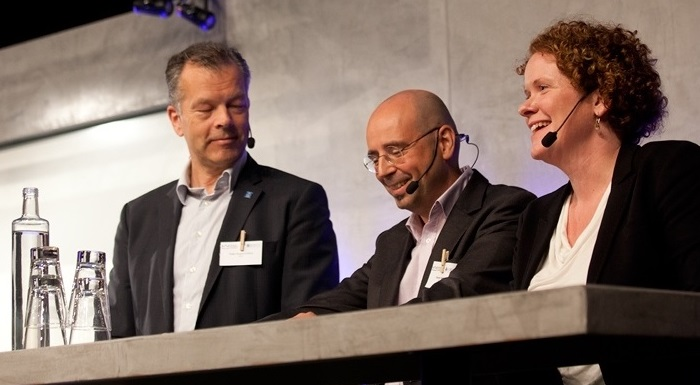
- Daniel Akenine (in the middle) at the annual Stockholm meeting, May 23'th 2013 together with the principal of the Royal Institute of Technology Peter Gudmundson and the Mayor of Stockholm Karin Wanngård.
- Born: Daniel Olof Charles Akenine; January 17, 1974 (age 52) Skåne, Sweden
- Occupation: Writer; technology officer

Daniel Olof Charles Akenine is a Swedish author, IT architect and former researcher in neurophysics. In 2008, he was ranked by IDG as one of "Sweden's top 10 developers/architects" and the same year appointed as National Technology Officer at Microsoft.

In 2015 Daniel received an IASA Fellowship for his work in the field of IT-architecture – one of the highest international awards in the field with profiles as Grady Booch as former recipients. In 2018 the newspapers Ny Teknik and Voister described Akenine as one of the developers of the technology behind blockchain. Between 2019 and 2023 Daniel was appointed member of the Swedish commission for digitalization by the Minister of Digital development and in 2022 he was ranked as one of Sweden's 50 most influential persons in tech.

In 2023 Daniel was elected as a fellow of the Royal Swedish Academy of Engineering Sciences.

== Biography ==
Akenine is a graduate of Lund University where he studied engineering physics, economics and law. After graduating Akenine began his career in a research group at Karolinska Institute in Stockholm, working with mathematical models of the human brain. During a later period at the Royal Institute of Technology, Akenine developed and launched one of the first anonymization services for Internet users. A service later acquired by a Canadian company. During his time at the Nasdaq stock exchange, Akenine developed and patented the cryptographic algorithm SecureLog – today mainly used in the financial sector to protect digital logs from tampering.

Akenine is the former chairman for the Swedish IT architect organization which he co-founded in 2007. He is a frequent commentator on matters of IT and privacy and a member in the international ISO:s expert committee for cloud standards.

== Authorship ==
After writing mostly non-fiction books Akenine debuted in 2014 with the thriller 11 Grams of Truth. The novel is about a man named Simian, using big data, psychology and machine learning to succeed in manipulating our world towards a predetermined future. The rights to the book were sold to the United States before it was published and Akenine was named by Aftonbladet, the largest newspaper in Sweden, as one of three debutants not to miss in 2014.

== Bibliography ==
- Humans and AI - Five Years Later (ISBN 9789180804189, 2023)
- Fundamentals of IT-architecture (ISBN 978-91-7697-245-8, 2022)
- Humans and AI (ISBN 978-91-7785-404-3, 2018)
- 11 grams of truth (ISBN 9789186775933, 2014)
- The IT-architecture book (ISBN 9789175579535, 2014)
- Integrity (Ax:son Johnsons stiftelse, 2014)
- Migrating to the Cloud (ISBN 978-3826692246, 2013)
