= TAFIM =

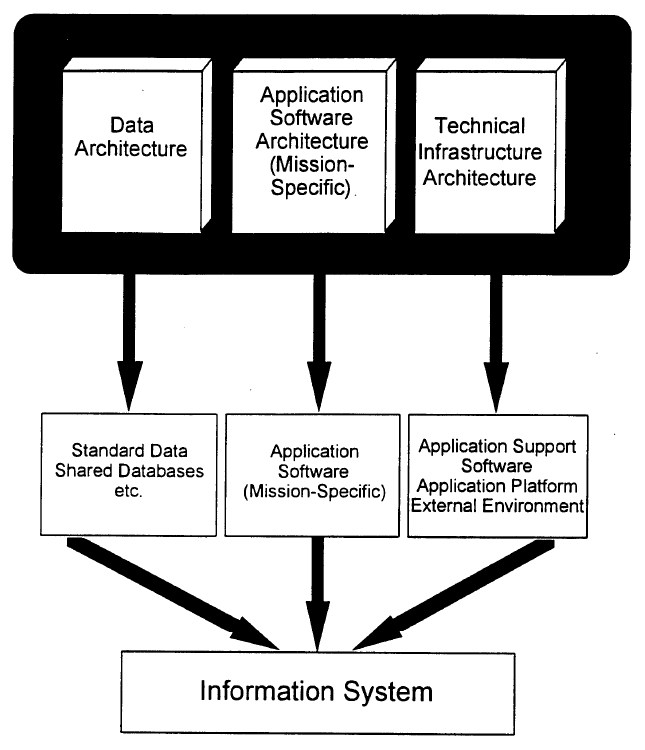
The Information Systems Architecture concept, as pictured by the TAFIM in 1996.

Technical Architecture Framework for Information Management (TAFIM) is a discontinued enterprise architecture framework that was developed by and for the United States Department of Defense (DoD).

TAFIM provided enterprise-level guidance for the evolution of the DoD Technical infrastructure. It identifies the services, standards, concepts, components, and configurations that can be used to guide the development of technical architectures that meet specific mission requirements.

TAFIM has been developed by the United States Department of Defense from 1986 until 1999. Parallel in 1994 they started the development of the C4ISR Architecture Framework, which evolved into the Department of Defense Architecture Framework (DoDAF) in the new millennium. TAFIM concepts are further developed in TOGAF, which first version in 1995 was based on the TAFIM framework.

== Overview ==
The "Technical Architecture Framework for Information Management" (TAFIM) was described in 1995 as:

- a target common conceptual framework or reference model for an information system infrastructure
- and the specific applications that the information system must support.

This architecture, and associated model, is not a specific system design. Rather, it establishes a common vocabulary and defines a set of services and interfaces common to information systems. It identifies standards and guidelines in terms of the architecture services and interfaces.

The architecture serves to facilitate the development of plans that will lead to interoperability between mission area applications, portability across mission areas and cost reductions through the use of common services.

TAFIM subsumes the widely accepted Open-system environment reference model within the network services and communications area.

== History ==
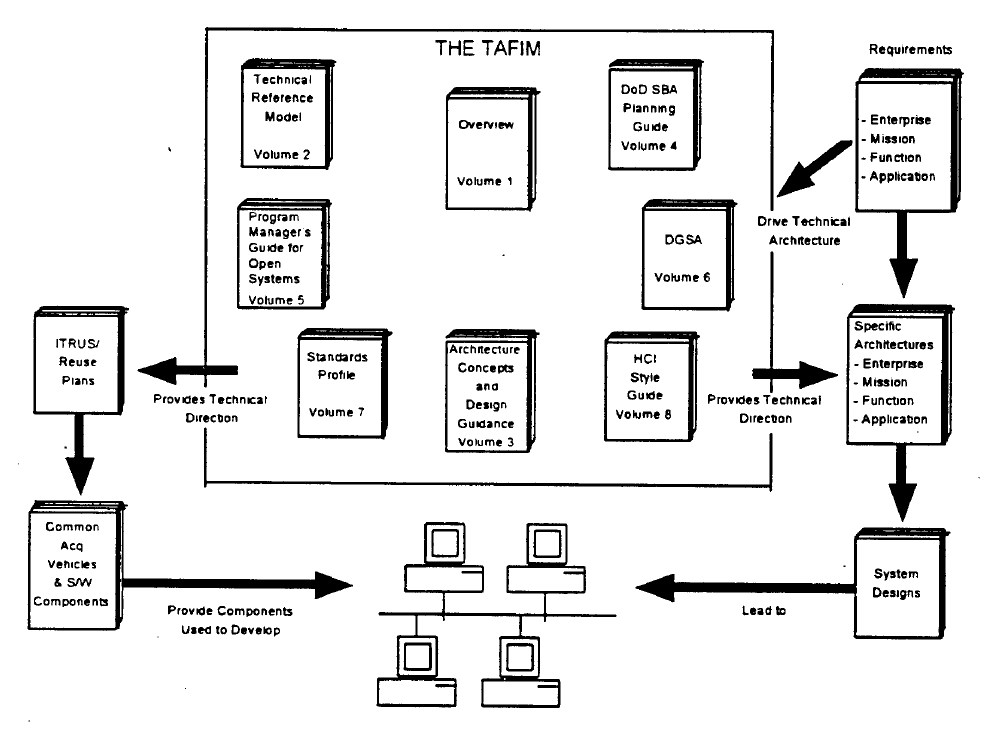
The eight-volume TAFIM documentation with the further architecture implementation concept.

The development of TAFIM started around 1986 at the US Defense Information Systems Agency/Center for Information Management. The first concept of TAFIM was derived from the NIST Application Portability Profile and the POSIX (or IEEE P1003.00SE) model.

The first draft of TAFIM was completed in 1991 with the TAFIM Technical Reference Model (TAFIM TRM). Developed by a team led by Burnes St. Patrick Hollyman, James M. Kerr and John Keane, this technical reference model wanted to use open systems and new technologies available in the commercial market, to develop a DoD-wide application. The TAFIM project has resulted in an eight-volume Information Technology Architecture "how-to" manual, see image. Before being officially published in 1996 by the Department of Defense, the approach was successfully piloted at both the U.S. Marine Corps and the DoD Health Affairs by teams led by Hollyman, Kerr, Keane.

The original development of TOGAF Version 1 in 1995 was based on the Technical Architecture Framework for Information Management. The US Department of Defense gave The Open Group explicit permission and encouragement to create TOGAF by building on the TAFIM, which itself was the result of many years of development effort and many millions of dollars of US Government investment.

The 1996 US DoD publication on TAFIM was the latest version published. TAFIM has been cancelled as a stand-alone document in 1999. In 2000 the whole TAFIM concept and its regulations have been re-evaluated and found inconsistent with the newly developed DoDAF architecture direction. For this reason all references to TAFIM have been removed from DoD documentation since then.

TAFIM was abruptly cancelled due to the following flaws:

- TAFIM required a large investment of both time and money
- The elapsed time required to produce the architecture makes it close to obsolete before completion
- Architectures of such complexity required specialized and reasonably uncommon IT expertise to complete. The end result is normally incomprehensible to a business-oriented audience and is harder to trace to the business strategy

That said, many of the core contributions to IT architectural thinking introduced within the TAFIM effort were retained and built upon through DoDAF, including TAFIM’s central concept of four interdependent architectural views. This concept, in fact, lives on in most modern discussions of IT architectures to this day.

== TAFIM topics ==
=== DoD technical and data standards ===
Defense’s technical and data standards are designed to enable systems to easily interoperate and transfer information. Its standard definitions for data elements are intended to ensure that users of all Defense systems define the same data in the same way and have a common understanding of their meaning. Defense has developed or is in the process of defining technical standards in the 1990s with the Technical Architecture Framework for Information Management (TAFIM), the Joint Technical Architecture (JTA), and the Defense Information Infrastructure Common Operating Environment (DII COE).

The Defense Information Systems Agency (DISA) is responsible for developing, obtaining from commercial sources, and maintaining the compilation of Defense Information Infrastructure technical standards, and it is responsible for maintaining a Defense data dictionary system as a repository of data requirements and for facilitating the cross-functional coordination and approval of standard formats, definitions, etc. PSAs, the military services, Defense agencies, and Joint Chiefs of Staff are responsible for reaching agreement on the standards and approving them as DOD standard data elements. DISA is then responsible for disseminating the approved standard data elements for use throughout the Department.

=== DoD Standards-Based Architecture Planning Process ===
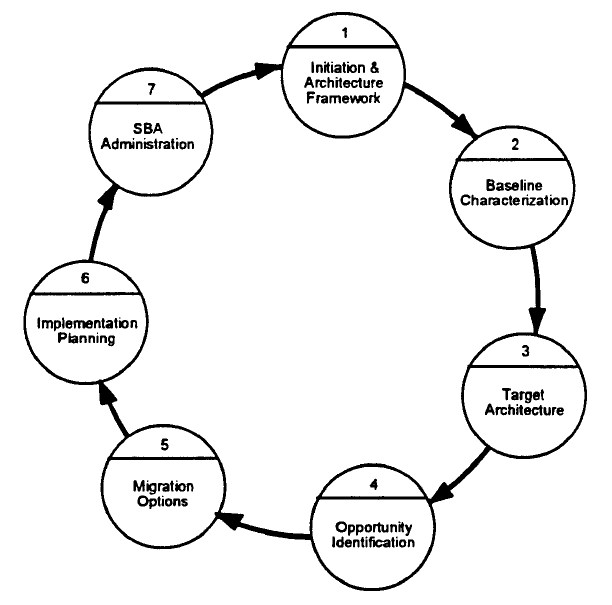
DoD Standards-Based Architecture Planning Process

The Standards-Based Architecture (SBA) planning process. defined by the TAFIM, consists of seven distinct, but interdependent, phases. Each phase of the SBA process is intended to create specific deliverable products and or documents, that guide the subsequent phase. The seven phases are briefly outlined below.

- Phase 1, Initiation and Architecture Framework : The methodology begins with a proper initiation of the process within the host organization. This involves developing a set of strategic drivers for the organization. Further, a business model is reviewed or built to establish a strategic target operation model.
- Phase 2. Baseline Characterization : This grounding phase intends to determine the organization's current architecture. It is an assessment of the current environment, which results in a characterization in four key dimensions or views: work, information, application and technology.
- Phase 3. Target Architecture : The various views of the framework are modeled in terms of a desirable target architecture, usually 3 to 5 years in the future.
- Phase 4. Opportunity Identification : Step from the conceptual reflection to practical realities and implementation, with determination of development projects needed.
- Phase 5. Migration Options : Links the reality of the present with the desirability of the target architecture by establishing one or more plateaus representing practical migration stages.
- Phase 6. Implementation Planning : Phase results in a detailed implementation plan for the first plateau of the migration effort.
- Phase 7. Institutionalizing the ITA Process : This phase is intended to keep the architecture alive and well by continuously improving it.

=== Integrated Model of Architectural Views ===
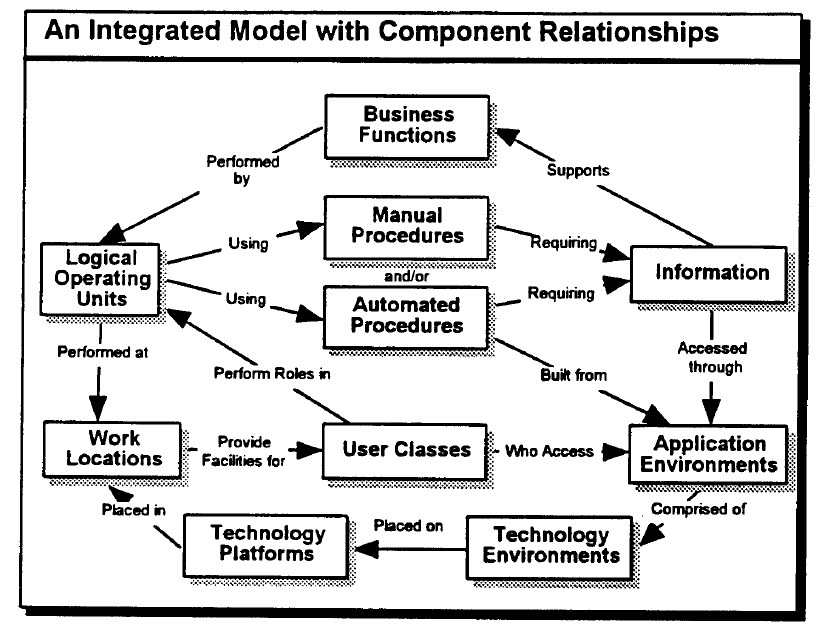
Integrated Model of Four Architectural Views.

The "Integrated Model of Four Architectural Views" is part of the target architecture, defined in the TAFIM. It gives a vision on the organization in all of its architectural views, especially the work architecture. The model, see figure, depicts an overall framework to develop the target architecture deliverable. Each view of the target architecture has some overlap with aspects of the other views. This overlap supports the argument that the model depicts the developing of a single, integrated architecture.

The entire enterprise, as defined, includes Work organization, Information, Application, and Technology. This leads to the four different views:

- Work Organization View : The work view of architecture is developed by identifying specific classes of users within the business environment (e.g. executives, planners, administrators, engineers, recruiters), business location (e.g. headquarters, sales office, plant, warehouse); and the logical representation of the business functions that are required to deliver products and services.
- Information Management View : The information architecture of the enterprise will contain three levels of detail, subject areas, data groups, and data attributes.
- Application View : This view focuses on the opportunities to autonomate aspects of work and or the access to information needed to perform work.
- Technology Infrastructure View : This areas of architecture uses specific component-level models to provide the basic for linking the technology view of the architecture to the work, information, and application views. The linchpin is the generic application environment.
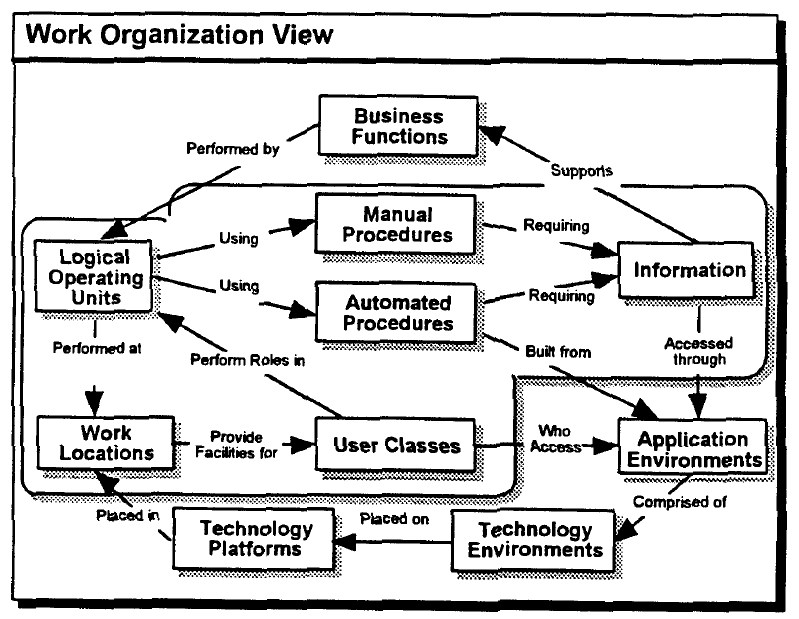
Work Organization View of the Architecture

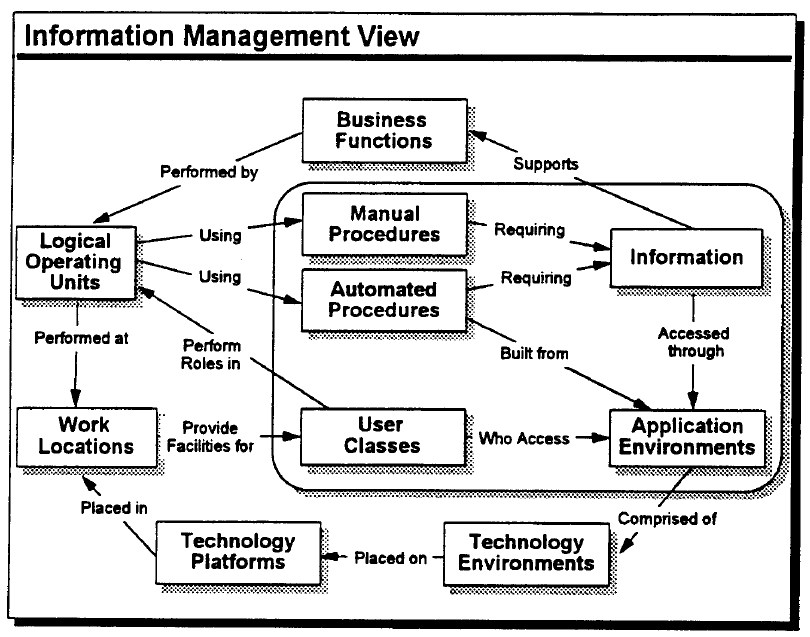
Information Management View of the Architecture

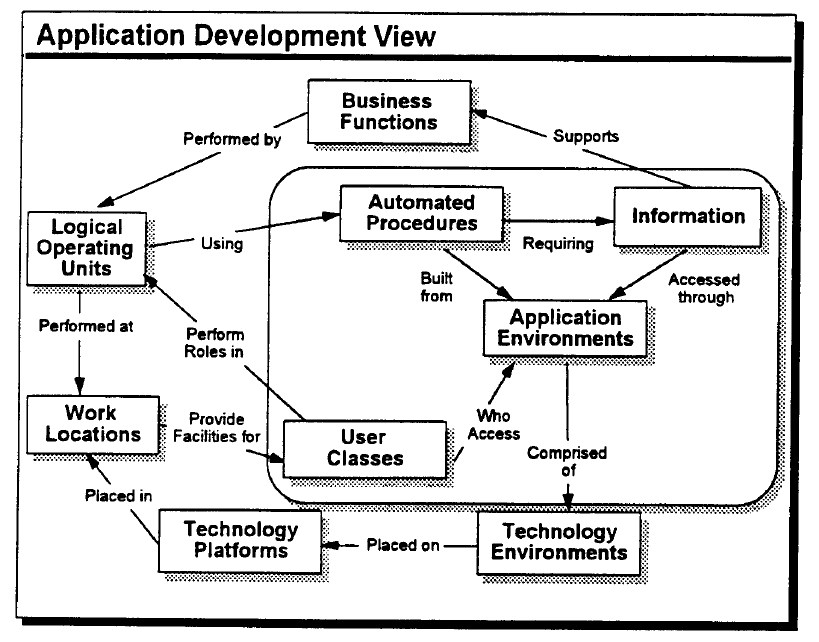
Application View of the Architecture.

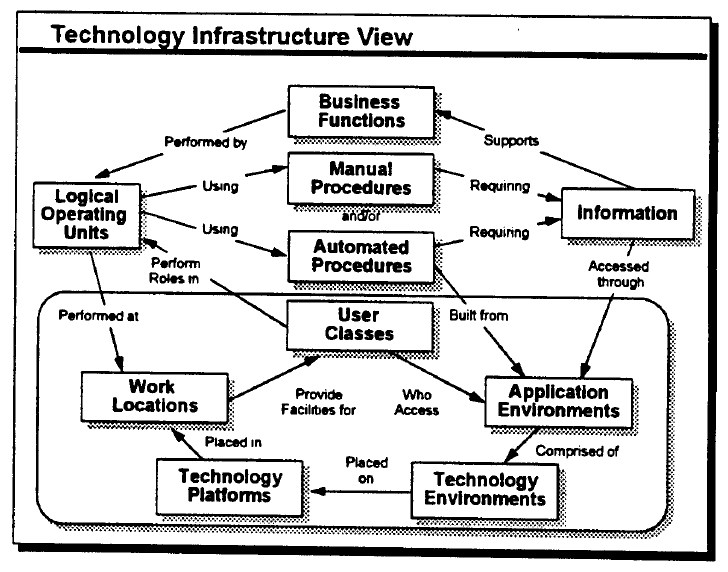
Technology Infrastructure View.

This gallery with the four views shows the interrelationship between the four views as mentioned earlier. In the view models of later Enterprise Architecture frameworks, such as the DoDAF the views are presented in layers and no longer interconnected.

== See also ==
- Enterprise Architecture framework
- Enterprise Architecture Planning
- GERAM
- Open System Environment Reference Model
- Treasury Information System Architecture Framework
- Treasury Enterprise Architecture Framework
- TOGAF
- Technical architecture
