= Paauwe =

Paauwe can refer to

- Bas Paauwe (1911–1989), Dutch footballer
- Cees Paauwe (born 1977), Dutch footballer (goalkeeper)
- Mark Paauwe (born ca. 1970), Dutch computer scientist and developer of Dragon1
- Patrick Paauwe (born 1975), Dutch footballer
