= Integrated Architecture Framework =

The Integrated Architecture Framework (IAF) is an enterprise architecture framework that covers business, information, information system and technology infrastructure. This framework has been developed by Capgemini since the 1990s, from the experience of practicing architects on projects for clients across the group. The first version was released in 1996 and was based on the Zachman Framework and Spewak's ideas about Enterprise Architecture Planning. Since Version 1.0 released in 1996 IAF has been developed by Capgemini's internal global architecture community drawing from the experience of practising architects. Now in its 6th edition, IAF provides alignment considering all relevant artefacts.

Its domains are:

- Business Architecture - people, process and organisation
- Information Architecture
- Information Systems - applications
- Technology Infrastructure - infrastructure
- Governance
- Security
- Sustainability

It has four levels of abstraction:

- Why - Contextual
- What - Conceptual
- How - Logical
- With What - Physical
