= Information Framework =

Information Framework (IFW) is an enterprise architecture framework, populated with a comprehensive set of banking-specific business models. It was developed as an alternative to the Zachman Framework by Roger Evernden.

The banking specific business models are an extension to the Component Business Model.

== Overview ==
The IFW business models describe the business of the bank and can be considered as an efficient communication bridge between business and technology communities. They are designed to be readily accessible to business users and focus on industry issues in areas such as Customer Insight, Multi-Channel Transformation, Core Systems, and Risk & Compliance.

The IFW comprises:

- Information Models: providing banking data content to address areas such as enterprise-wide view of information;
- Process Models: providing banking business processes content to address areas such as business process re-engineering;
- Integration Models: providing business services content to address areas such as services-oriented architectures;

The IFW business models typically support over 80% of business requirements and can be customized and extended to cover the specific requirements of a bank. The IFW business models will assist a bank in implementing a flexible, reusable, extensible, and easily customizable architecture, which in turn will enable the bank to:

- Be more adaptive and respond quickly to changing customer needs;
- Focus on achieving competitive differentiation;
- Identify and leverage best practice behaviors across the organization;

In its conception, the IFW was an enterprise architecture framework created as an alternative to the Zachman Framework. In 1987 John Zachman proposed the Zachman Framework to describe Information Architecture with the six concepts: The what related to data, how related to process, where related to network and location, who related to actors and people, when related to time, and at last why related to motivation.

== Industry Models ==
This framework has become part of what is commonly known as the Industry Models. The IBM Industry Models are used primarily for the development of internal company standards, and provide an overall integration layer across an organization's existing and future IT investments. With their strong business and IT orientation, IBM Industry Models are designed to be customized to reflect the precise needs of every company using them. Hence, every company will have its own customized industry-specific version of IBM's data, process and service models, allowing them to represent areas that are unique to their business and constitute competitive advantage. In addition, the models can be easily augmented to embrace industry extensions, jurisdiction and company-specific extensions.

The Industry Models (IFW) has products for the following industries:

- Banking and Financial Markets (Data, Process, Services),
- Insurance (Data, Process, Services),
- Healthcare (Data),
- Telecommunications (Data),
- Retail (Data).

While in some markets IBM Industry Models have become de facto standards, their purpose is not to standardize at the level of an industry, but to provide the basis for defining corporate standards. IBM's approach is to facilitate or embody the most important industry standards, which are most often data models or messaging formats. Architectural elements in the IBM Industry Models are data models, process models and service models.

== Banking and financial markets ==
The Information Framework for banking and financial markets contains products containing data, process and services models primarily focused on data warehouse and service-oriented architecture domains.

=== IBM Banking and Financial Markets Data Warehouse (BFMDW) ===
The banking and financial markets industry tackles three challenges. The first is its medium- to long-term future and how the organization perceives the issues of revenue and risk. Central to the decision about which risks to accept is the need to quantify those risks for trades, hedge funds, counterparties, and pricing. The management of risk is strategic to an organization's corporate intent and survival. The second area of focus is how to respond to the growing demands of regulatory compliance, including requirements such as Basel II and Basel III, the Single Euro Payments Area (SEPA), the Mortgage Industry Standards Maintenance Organization (MISMO) standards, International Financial Reporting Standards (IFRS), International Accounting Standards (IAS), the Capital Adequacy Directive (CAD), Anti-money laundering (AML) regulations, and others. The investments in meeting compliance requirements can be significant, so the challenge is how to do this without impacting profitability. Organizations that can turn such investments into market advantage will reap the benefits. The third challenge is addressing the requirements of efficiency, growth, and resiliency to provide more relevant, robust, timely, and cost-effective information to business decision makers. Customer retention is important in a volatile market, so attention must also be paid to enhancing the customer experience.

=== IBM Banking Data Warehouse (BDW) ===
The BDW is a derivative of the BFMDW and contains content only relevant to the banking industry.

=== IBM Financial Markets Data Warehouse (FMDW) ===
The FMDW is a derivative of the BFMDW and contains only content relevant to the financial markets industry.

=== IBM Banking Process and Service Models (BPS) ===
The pace of change in the financial services industry has accelerated markedly in recent years. Mergers and acquisitions, the introduction of channel architecture, the development of technologies such as internet banking and telephone banking, the introduction of product bundling and the shift in focus from transactional systems to customer-facing systems, such as operational single view of customer, have all brought about extensive changes in the way financial services organizations operate. By necessity, standalone solutions have been developed, supported by an array of individual processes and procedures that often mimic and duplicate each other, but are sufficiently disparate to cause cost and training issues for financial services organizations, impairing the synergies and savings available to a coherent, strategic organization. A structured approach to any business or IT initiative is imperative to the success of projects. Utilizing the BPS models can act as the formal blueprint for process and services design and be utilized as a tool to bring both business and IT together.

There are many benefits to be derived from using the BPS models, such as:

- Increase customer satisfaction, grow the customer base and reduce the cost of selling and servicing customers
- Identify opportunities to streamline processes, making service delivery cheaper and quicker
- Identify processes that essentially do the same thing and therefore should be amenable to rationalization. This reduces training and maintenance overheads, improves your cost-income ratio and provides better and less costly service to your customers
- Be better able to ensure completeness in terms of regulatory compliance and risk management, potentially releasing capital to provide additional lending and investment capacity
- Designed to be understood by both business and IT, and acts as a communication bridge between communities.
- Provides an environment in which reuse possibilities can be identified and verified.
- Provides a firm basis on which integration or SOA solutions can be built.
- Allows you to construct services within a formalized model.
- Provides traceability from service definitions back to business requirements.

The BPS models have coverage in the following areas: Sales & Relationship Management; KYC/Account Opening; Lending; Card Products Administration; Commercial / Syndicated Lending; Mortgages; Trade Finance; Savings, Investments & Term Deposits; Transfer Services; Payments -Direct Debit / Credit Transfer / Deposit / Withdrawal; Cash Management; Wealth Management; Product & Marketing Management; Regulatory & Compliance; Best Execution/MiFID; Trade Processing; Corporate Actions; Asset & Liability Management; and Human Resource Administration.

== Insurance ==
Contains products containing data, process and services models primarily focused on Data Warehouse and Services Oriented Architecture domains.

=== IBM Insurance Application Architecture (IAA) ===
The Insurance Application Architecture (IAA) is a comprehensive set of insurance specific models that represents best practices in insurance and is a natural extension to the Component Business Model. The IAA models provide the insurance specific business content to accelerate the projects that result from moving to an On Demand Business and pick up the definition of the components that take you there. IAA describes the business of the insurer and is an efficient communication bridge between business and technology communities. It is designed to be readily accessible to business users and by focusing on industry issues such as Sales and Customer Services, Marketing and Analytics, Customer Relationship Management, Policy Administration, Product Development, Insurance Claims and Risk and Compliance.

The IAA models have coverage in the following areas: LOB Customer Acquisition (Individual Insurance), LOB Underwriting (Individual Insurance), LOB Customer Acquisition (Group Insurance), LOB Policy Administration (Individual), LOB Claim Management (Individual), LOB Policy Administration / Claim (Group), Financial Transaction / Investment, Reinsurance Management, Intermediary Management, Provider Management, Human Resource Management, Customer Relationship Management, Marketing Management, Product Development, Risk Policy Management, Risk Mitigation and Assessment, and Risk Reporting and Review.

== Other industries ==
- Healthcare : Contains products containing data models primarily focused on the Data Warehouse domain.
- Telecommunications : Contains products containing data models primarily focused on the Data Warehouse domain.
- Retail : Contains products containing data models primarily focused on the Data Warehouse domain.
