= Roger Evernden =

- Occupation(s): Musician, composer, pianist
- Instrument: Piano
- Years active: 1982 - present
- Website: https://www.rogerevernden.net/

Roger Evernden (born ca. 1954) is a British enterprise architect, musician, composer, and writer. He is a consultant at the Cutter Consortium, known for his contributions to Enterprise Architecture and as author of the Information FrameWork, an enterprise architecture framework presented in 1996 as a more generic alternative to the Zachman Framework. He has given talks on enterprise architecture.

As a musician and composer he is best known for his solo piano albums.

== Career ==
In the late 1980s, Evernden developed Information FrameWork (IFW) to describe an enterprise architect initiative at Westpac. IFW was presented in 1996 as framework for Information management, and more generic alternative to the Zachman Framework. Evernden (1996) explained:

the objectives and scope of IFW are broader than that of the original Zachman framework. IFW is described and compared with the original Zachman structure, showing the evolution, changes, and the rationale behind the changes based on experiences from within the financial services industry.

In a 1996 paper Evernden showed "how the structure of IFW has been populated by industry-wide models and supported by a distinctive methodology. A detailed discussion of each of the six dimensions of the IFW architecture is presented."

During the 2008 financial crisis, he spoke about how enterprise architecture could be used to weather unpredictable events. In 2011 he described the architectural approach to create a single integrated IT platform from two heritage banking systems following the Lloyds TSB acquisition of HBOS to form Lloyds Banking Group January 2009.

In 2017 he presented a case study at Vesta Corporation describing a combination of online training and webinars in a nine-month program to build the capabilities and confidence of their enterprise architecture team.

=== Writing ===
Evernden is co-author, with Elaine Evernden, of Information First: Integrating Knowledge and Information Architecture for Business Advantage, which was first published in 2003, expanding the concepts of Information FrameWork (IFW). A second edition was published in 2015 with the title: Enterprise Architecture – the Eight Fundamental Factors.

This book deals with the architecture of an enterprise and the challenge of dealing with information.

Roger and Elaine Evernden argue that in order to address that challenge, organizations must treat information as a business resource, much like capital or labor. They require expertise and strategic thinking to use that resource as part of a business strategy, and to leverage its potential. More than just data to be used in operative processes, information must be seen as the essence of all decision-making and knowledge-building efforts in the enterprise, something that must be adapted to the people using it and interacting with it.

== Selected publications ==
- Evernden, Roger. "The information framework." IBM Systems Journal 35.1 (1996): 37–68.
- Evernden, Roger, Information FrameWork (IFW): 1996 Systems Journal Article and 2011 Update, 2018
- Elaine Evernden, Roger Evernden. Information First. Elsevier, 2003/2012.
- Elaine Evernden, Roger Evernden. Enterprise Architecture – the Eight Fundamental Factors. CreateSpace, 2015, ISBN 1517364361
- Evernden, Roger, and Elaine Evernden. "Third-generation information architecture." Communications of the ACM 46.3 (2003): 95–98.
- Evernden, R. Mastering Complexity to Drive EA Productivity, Cutter Consortium Executive Report, Vol. 16, No. 1, 2013
