= Application Portability Profile =

Framework for Open-System Environment

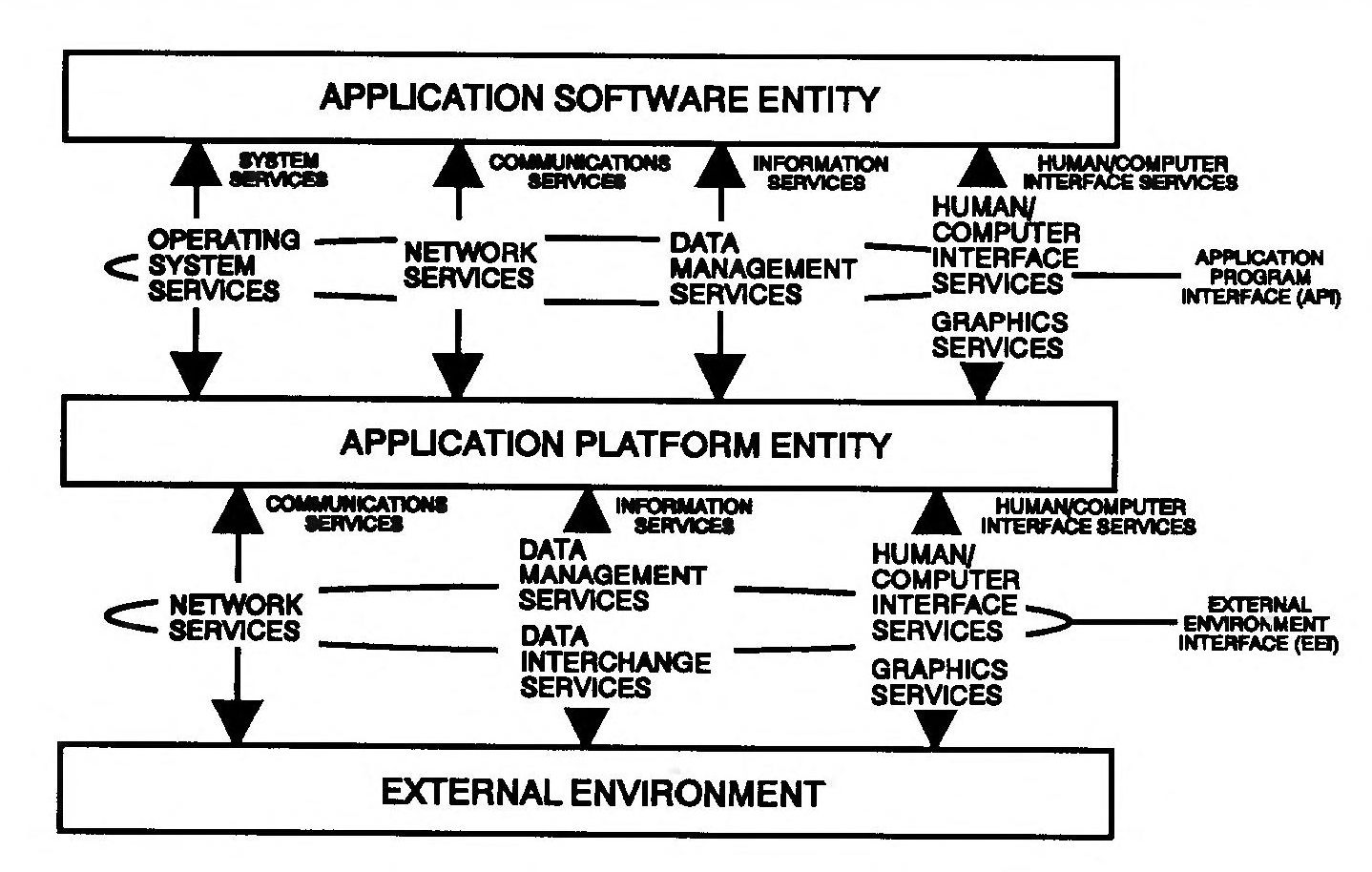
Application Portability Profile (APP) Service Areas and the Open-system environment reference model (OSE-RM).

The Application Portability Profile (APP) is a 1990s framework for Open-System Environment designed by the NIST for use by the U.S. Government. It contains a selected suite of specifications that defines the interfaces, services, protocols, and data formats for a particular class or domain of applications.

The Application Portability Profile offers structure to "integrate US federal, national and international, and other specifications to provide the functionality necessary to accommodate the broad range of US federal information technology requirements."

== Overview ==
In the second half of the 20th century information systems initially developed from isolated islands of computing. Through progressive changes, these individual systems became connected by common users and common information needs. Late 20th century these systems were well on the way to migrating toward computing environments that consist of distributed, heterogeneous, networked applications, databases, and hardware. The concept emerged of a federal computing environment, that is built on an infrastructure defined by open, consensus-based standards which serve as de facto means of organizing these systems. The NIST developed such an infrastructure, and named it Open System Environment (OSE).

An Open System Environment (OSE) encompasses the functionality needed to provide interoperability, portability, and scalability of computerized applications across networks of heterogeneous, multi-vendor hardware/software/communications platforms. The Open System Environment forms an extensible framework that allows services, interfaces, protocols, and supporting data formats to be defined in terms of nonproprietary specifications that evolve through open (public), consensus-based forums.

Complementary to the Open System Environment is the Application Portability Profile standard. This standard can covers a broad range of application software domains of interest to many US federal agencies, but it does not include every domain within the U.S. Government's application inventory. The individual standards and specifications in the APP define data formats, interfaces, protocols, or a mix of these elements.

== APP topics ==
=== APP and the NIST Enterprise Architecture Model ===
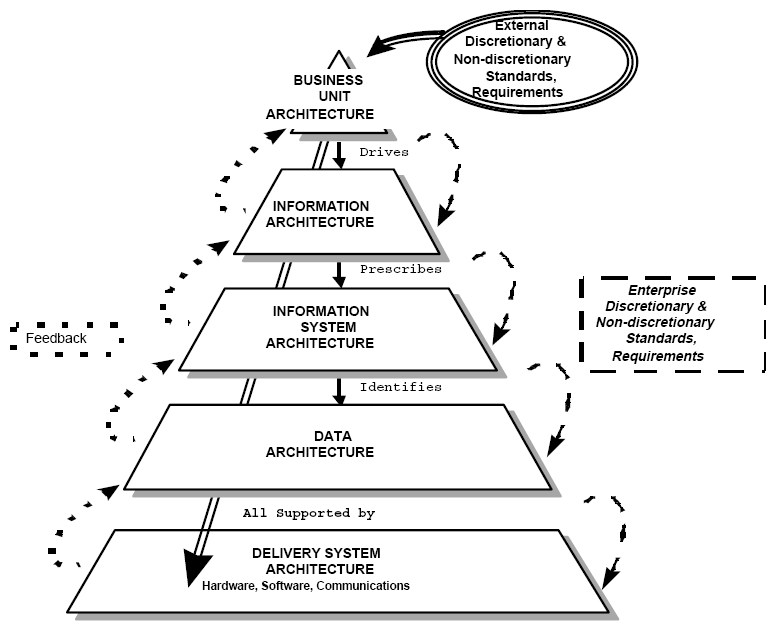
The APP addresses the lowest architecture in the NIST Enterprise Architecture Model, i.e., the Delivery System Architecture.

The "Application Portability Profile (APP) - The U.S. Government’s Open System Environment Profile Version 3.0" provides recommendations on a set of industry, Federal, national, international and other specifications that define interfaces, services, protocols, and data formats to support an Open System Environment (OSE).

The APP addresses the lowest architecture in the NIST Enterprise Architecture Model, i.e., the Delivery System Architecture. On this level the hardware of the computer architecture, the software and the communications are being specified. Based on these specification recommendations, various services and agencies have defined detailed technical reference models.

=== APP service areas ===
The services defined in the Application Portability Profile fall into the following broad spectrum of service areas:

- Operating system services (OS)
- Human/computer interface services (HCI)
- Data management services (DM)
- Data interchange services (DI)
- Software engineering services (SWE)
- Graphics services (GS)
- Network services (NS)

Each of the Application Portability Profile service areas addresses specific components around which interface, data format, or protocol specifications have been or will be defined. Security and management services are common to all of the service areas and pervade these areas in one or more forms.

== Applications ==
In the 1990s the NIST's Application Portability Profile has been applicated in several Enterprise Information Architecture frameworks, such as:

- Information Architecture framework for the U.S. Patent and Trademark Office (PTO) of the Department of Commerce (DoC), and
- Department of Defense (DoD) in its Technical Architecture Framework for Information Management (TAFIM)
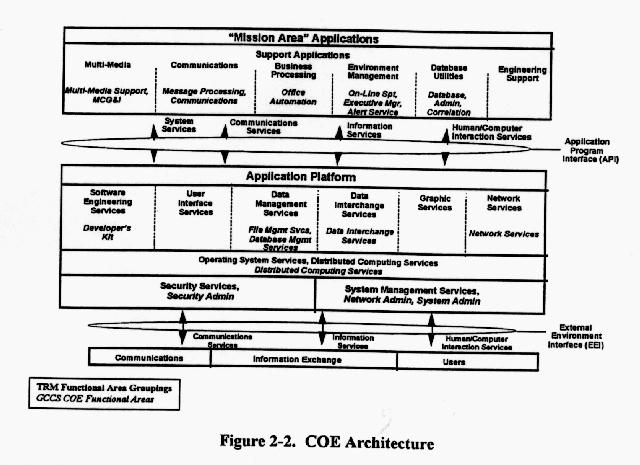
C4I Technical Architecture, COE Architecture, 1995

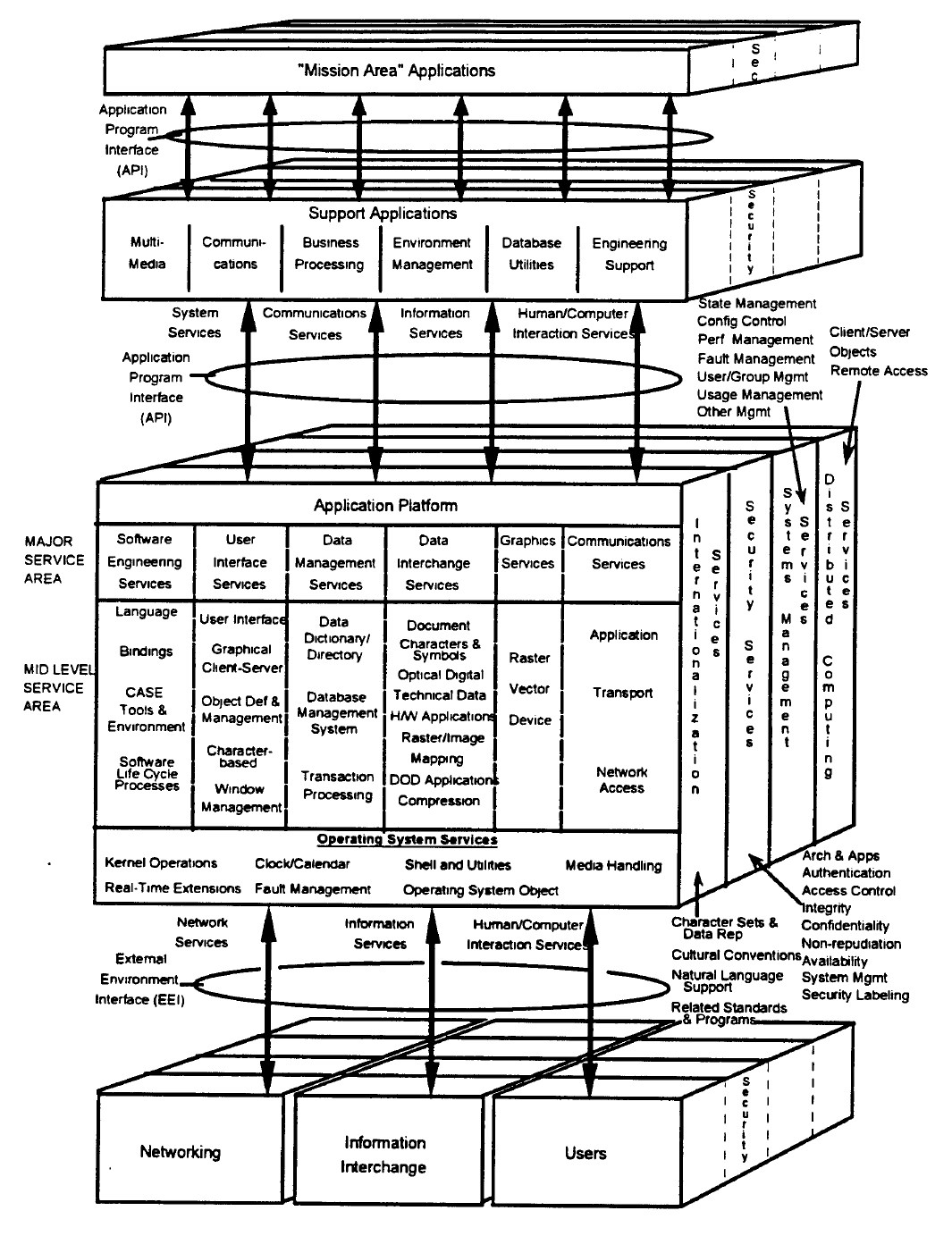
Detailed DoD Technical Reference Model, 1996
