= Open-system environment reference model =

Reference model for enterprise architecture

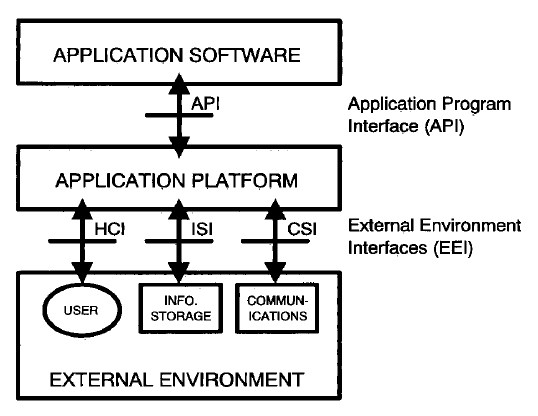
Open System Environment Reference Model, 1995.

Open-system environment (OSE) reference model (RM) or OSE reference model (OSE/RM) is a 1990 reference model for enterprise architecture. It provides a framework for describing open system concepts and defining a lexicon of terms, that can be agreed upon generally by all interested parties.

This reference model is meant as an environment model, complementary to the POSIX architecture for open systems. It offers an extensible framework that allows services, interfaces, protocols, and supporting data formats to be defined in terms of nonproprietary specifications that evolve through open (public), consensus-based forums. This reference model served in the 1990s as a basic building block of several technical reference models and technical architectures.

In 1996 this reference model was standardized in the ISO/IEC TR 14252 titled "Information technology -- Guide to the POSIX Open System Environment (OSE)".

== History ==
The development of the open-system environment reference model started early 1990s by the NIST as refinement of the POSIX (Portable Operating System Interface) standard. POSIX is a standard for maintaining compatibility between operating systems, and addresses interoperation for communications, computing, and entertainment infrastructure. Its development started late 1980s by the POSIX Working Group 1003.0 of the Institute of Electrical and Electronics Engineers (IEEE).

The NIST hosted workshops and conducts other support activities to assist users in addressing open systems requirements, preparing for the use of new technology, and identifying the international, national, industry and other open specifications that are available for building open systems frameworks, such as the government's applications portability profile for the open-system environment.

NIST sponsors the semiannual Users' Forum on Application Portability Profile (APP) and Open System Environment (OSE) to exchange information and respond to NIST proposals regarding the evaluation and adoption of an integrated set of standards to support the APP and OSE. The quarterly Open Systems Environment Implementors' Workshop (OIW), co-sponsored by NIST and the Institute of Electrical and Electronics Engineers (IEEE) Computer Society, provides a public international technical forum for the timely development of implementation agreements based on emerging OSE standards.

== OSE/RM topics ==
The open-system environment (OSE) forms an extensible framework that allows services, interfaces, protocols, and supporting data formats to be defined in terms of nonproprietary specifications that evolve through open (public), consensus-based forums. A selected suite of specifications that defines these interfaces, services, protocols, and data formats for a particular class or domain of applications is called a profile.

Two types of elements are used in the model: entities consisting of the application software, application platform, and platform external environment; and interfaces including the application program interface and external environment interface.

=== APP service areas ===
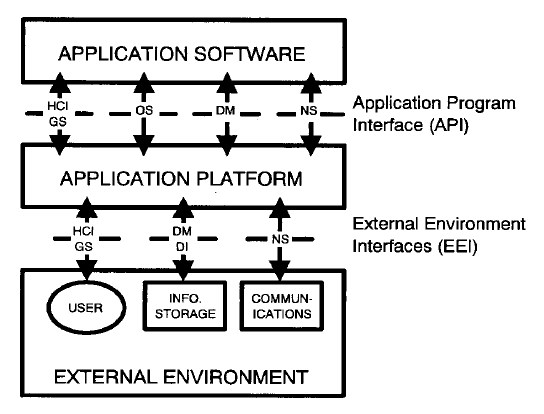
APP Service Areas and the OSE-RM

The Application Portability Profile (APP) is an OSE profile designed for use by the U.S. Government. It covers a broad range of application software domains of interest to many Federal agencies, but it does not include every domain within the U.S. Government’s application inventory. The individual standards and specifications in the APP define data formats, interfaces, protocols, or a mix of these elements.

The services defined in the APP tend to fall into broad service areas. These service areas are:

- Operating system services (OS)
- Human/computer interface services (HCI)
- Data management services (DM)
- Data interchange services (DI)
- Software engineering services (SWE)
- Graphics services (GS)
- Network services (NS)

Each service area is defined in the following sections. The figure illustrates where each of these services areas relates to the OSE/RM. Assume that software engineering services are applicable in all areas. Each of the APP service areas addresses specific components around which interface, data format, or protocol specifications have been or will be defined. Security and management services are common to all of the service areas and pervade these areas in one or more forms.

=== Classes of interfaces ===
There are two classes of interfaces in the OSE reference model: the application program interface and the external environment interface:

- Application programming interface (API) : The API is the interface between the application software and the application platform. Its primary function is to support portability of application software. An API is categorized in accordance with the types of service accessible via that API. There are four types of API services in the OSE/RM:
  - Human/computer interface services
  - Information interchange services
  - Communication services
  - Internal system services
- External environment interface (EEI) : The EEI is the interface that supports information transfer between the application platform and the external environment, and between applications executing on the same platform. Consisting chiefly of protocols and supporting data formats, the EEI supports interoperability to a large extent. An EEI is categorized in accordance with the type of information transfer services provided.

=== OSE profile ===
A profile consists of a selected list of standards and other specifications that define a complement of services made available to applications in a specific domain. Examples of domains might include a workstation environment, an embedded process control environment, a distributed environment, a transaction processing environment, or an office automation environment, to name a few. Each of these environments has a different cross-section of service requirements that can be specified independently from the others. Each service, however, is defined in a standard form across all environments.

An OSE profile is composed of a selected list of open (public), consensus-based standards and specifications that define services in the OSE/RM. Restricting a profile to a specific domain or group of domains that are of interest to an individual organization results in the definition of an organizational profile.

=== OSE reference model entities ===
The three classes of OSE reference model entities are described as follows:

- Application software : Within the context of the OSE Reference Model, the application software includes data, documentation, and training, as well as programs.
- Application platform : The application platform is composed of the collection of hardware and software components that provide the generic application and system services.
- Platform external environment : The platform external environment consists of those system elements that are external to the application software and the application platform (e.g., services provided by other platforms or peripheral devices).

=== Types of information transfer services ===
There are three types of information transfer services. These are transfer services to and from:

- Human users
- External data stores
- Other application platforms

In its simplest form, the OSE/RM illustrates a straightforward user-supplier relationship: the application software is the user of services and the application platform/ external environment entities are the suppliers. The API and EEI define the services that are provided.

== Applications ==
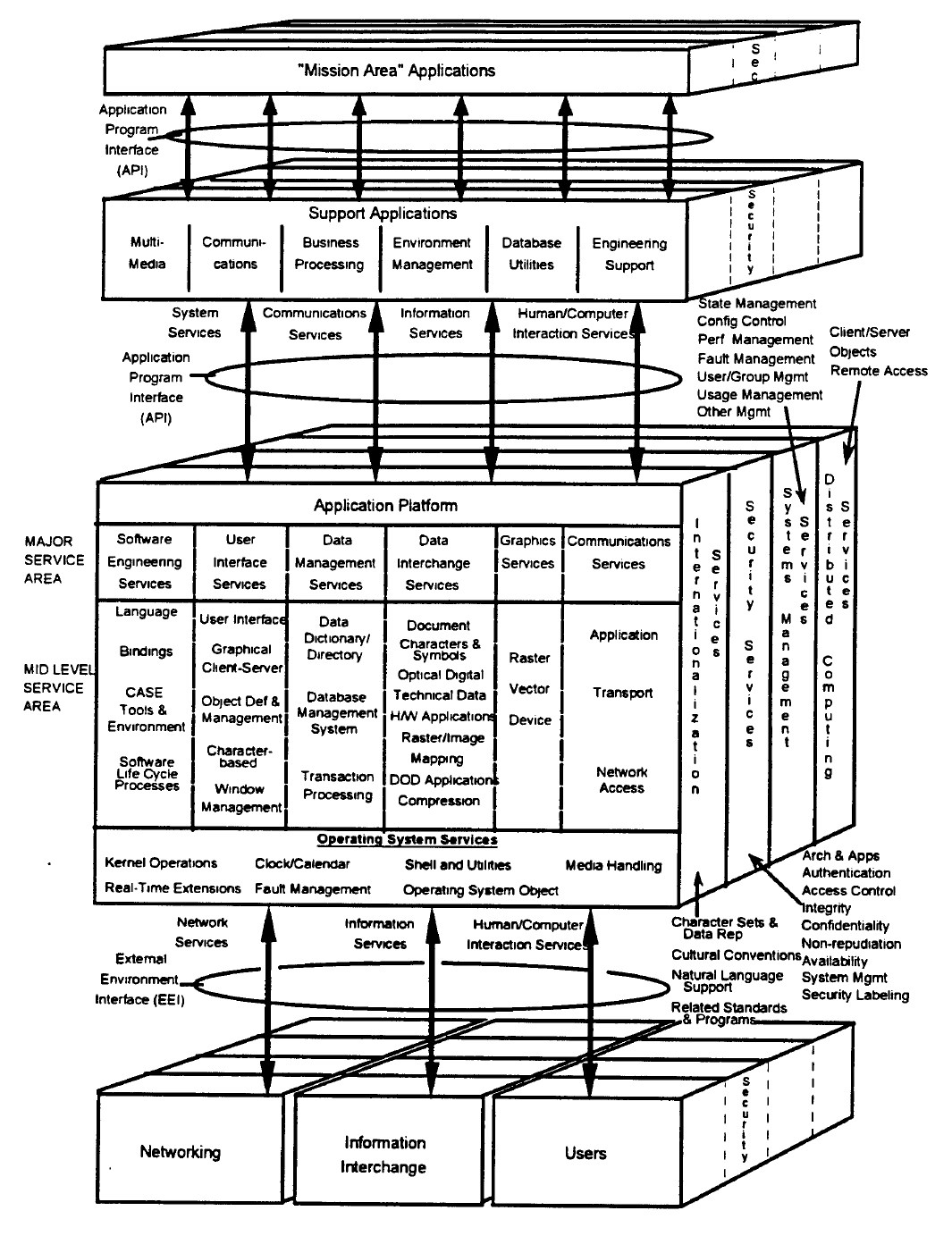
Detailed DoD technical reference model of the TAFIM, is based on the Open System Environment model.

Basically, the open-system environment model is a basic building block of several technical reference models and technical architecture. A technical architecture identifies and describes the types of applications, platforms, and external entities; their interfaces; and their services; as well as the context within which the entities interoperate.

A technical architecture is based on:

- a Technical Reference Model (TRM); and
- the selected standards that further describe the TRM elements (the profile).

The technical architecture is the basis for selecting and implementing the infrastructure to establish the target architecture.

A technical reference model can be defined as a taxonomy of services arranged according to a conceptual model, such as the Open System Environment model. The enumerated services are specific to those needed to support the technology computing style (e.g., distributed object computing) and the industry/business application needs (e.g., Human Services, financial).

== See also ==
- Enterprise architecture framework
- Federal enterprise architecture
- GERAM
- TAFIM
- TOGAF
