= Enterprise life cycle =

Process of changing an enterprise over time

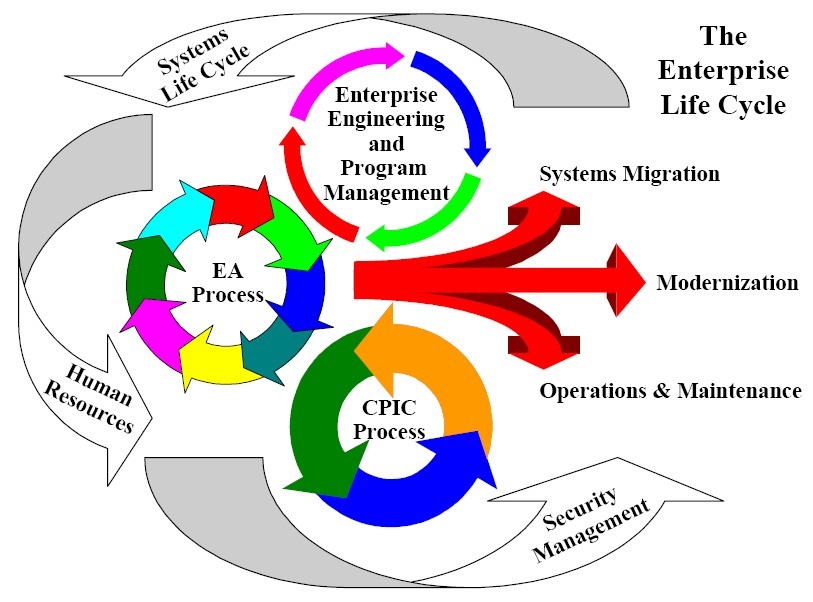
Illustration of the Enterprise Life Cycle.

Enterprise life cycle (ELC) in enterprise architecture is the dynamic, iterative process of changing the enterprise over time by incorporating new business processes, new technology, and new capabilities, as well as maintenance, disposition and disposal of existing elements of the enterprise.

== Overview ==
The enterprise life cycle is a key concept in enterprise architecture (EA), enterprise engineering and systems engineering. The Enterprise Architecture process is closely related to similar processes, as program management cycle or systems development life cycle, and has similar properties to those found in the product life cycle.

The concept of enterprise life cycle aids in the implementation of enterprise architecture, and the capital planning and investment control (CPIC) process that selects, controls, and evaluates investments. Overlying these processes are human capital management and information security management. When these processes work together effectively, the enterprise can effectively manage information technology as a strategic resource and business process enabler. When these processes are properly synchronized, systems migrate efficiently from legacy technology environments through evolutionary and incremental developments, and the Agency is able to demonstrate its return on investment (ROI). The figure on top illustrates the interaction of the dynamic and interactive cycles as they would occur over time.

== Enterprise life cycle topics ==
=== Enterprise architecture process ===
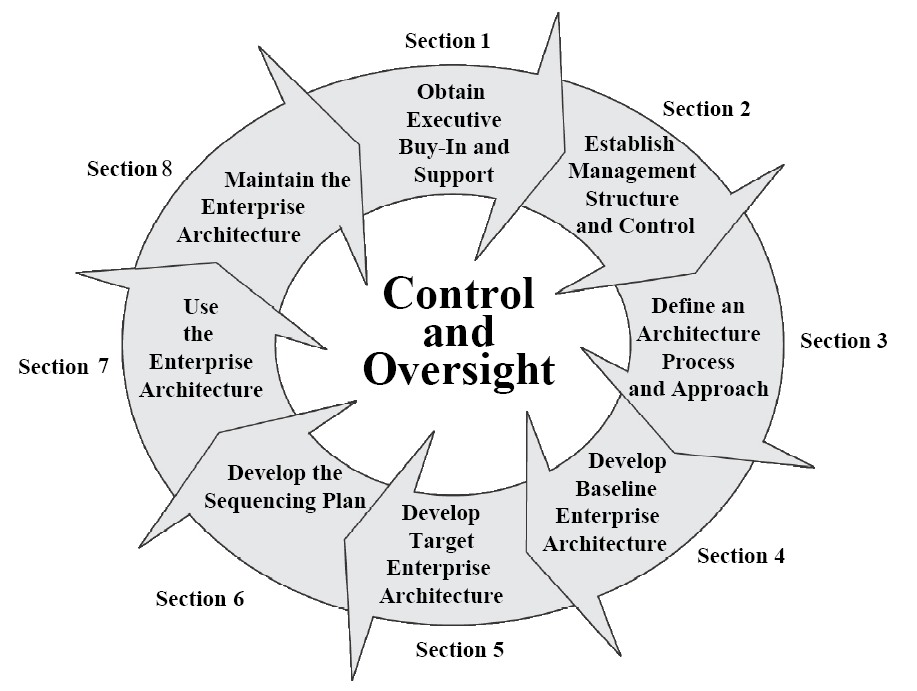
Enterprise Architecture Process.

As a prerequisite to the development of every enterprise architecture, each Agency should establish the need to develop an EA and formulate a strategy that includes the definition of a vision, objectives, and principles. The figure shows a representation of the EA process. Executive buy-in and support should be established and an architectural team created within the organization. The team defines an approach and process tailored to Agency needs. The architecture team implements the process to build both the baseline and target EAs.

The architecture team also generates a sequencing plan for the transition of systems, applications, and associated business practices predicated upon a detailed gap analysis. The architecture is employed in the CPIC and the enterprise engineering and program management processes via prioritized, incremental projects and the insertion of emerging new technologies. Lastly, the architectures are maintained through a continuous modification to reflect the Agency's current baseline and target business practices, organizational goals, visions, technology, and infrastructure.

=== Architecture life cycle ===
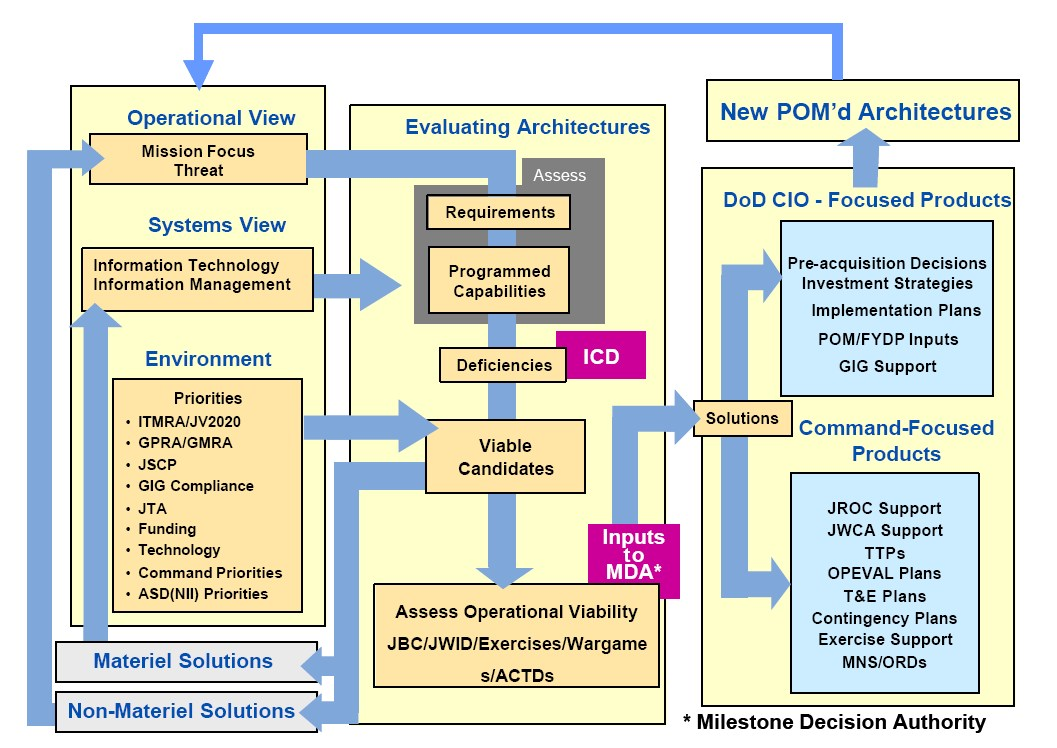
DoDAF Architecture Life Cycle.

The figure depicts the life of the architecture as it evolves and shows the process that the architecture description supports in the development, analysis, and evolution of the implemented architecture. In this illustration, the Operational View is used to drive the requirements that are evaluated against the Systems View. Operational deficiencies are derived from the analysis, and viable candidates are identified. These candidates can take the form of either materiel or non- materiel solutions and are modeled back into the Operational and Systems Views of the architecture.

The architecture is re-analyzed, and the process continues until the operational deficiencies are minimized. The final sets of viable candidates are assessed for operational viability. Based on the results of the assessments, design changes are made and submitted for inclusion into the budgeting process. This process of developing, analyzing, and modifying continues throughout the architecture's life cycle.

=== Enterprise life cycle activities ===
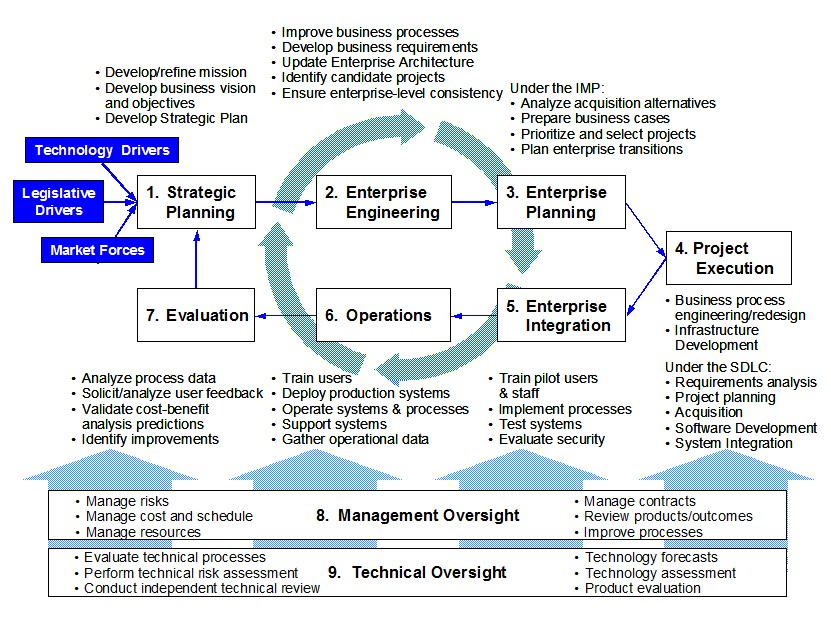
TEAF Enterprise Life Cycle activities

An enterprise life cycle integrates the management, business, and engineering life cycle processes that span the enterprise to align its business and IT activities. Enterprise life cycle refers generally to an organization's approach for managing activities and making decisions during ongoing refreshment of business and technical practices to support its enterprise mission. These activities include investment management, project definition, configuration management, accountability, and guidance for systems development according to a system development life cycle (SDLC).

The enterprise life cycle applies to enterprise-wide planning activities and decision making. By contrast, a System Development Life Cycle generally refers to practices for building individual systems. Determining what systems to build is an enterprise-level decision.

The figure on the right depicts notional activities of an enterprise life cycle methodology. Within the context of this document, Enterprise Life Cycle does not refer to a specific methodology or a specific bureau's approach. Each organization needs to follow a documented Enterprise Life Cycle methodology appropriate to its size, the complexity of its enterprise, and the scope of its needs.

=== Enterprise Performance Life Cycle ===
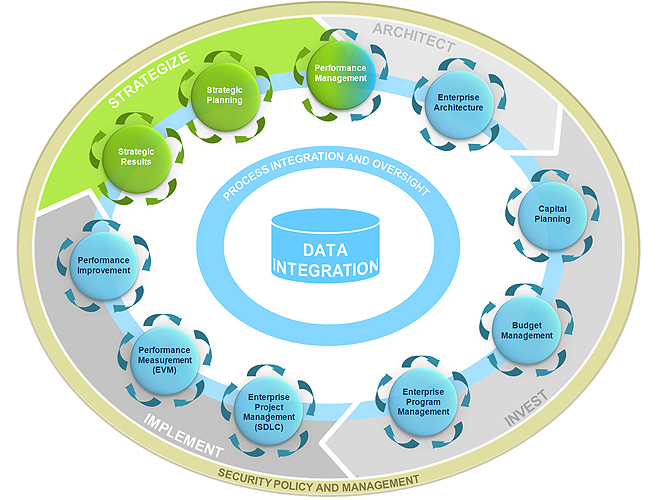
Illustration of the Enterprise Performance Life Cycle of the U.S. Department of Health & Human Services.

The Enterprise Performance Life Cycle (EPLC) encompasses the major business functions executed under the Office of the Chief Information Officer (CIO), and in particular, shows at a high level the relationship among the different business functions and both the general order and the iterative nature of their execution. The placement of enterprise architecture in the center of the EPLC conceptual diagram, shown in the figure, reflects the supporting and enabling role that enterprise architecture serves for the major business functions in the Enterprise Performance Life Cycle.

The Enterprise Architecture (EA) Program explicitly considers the information needs of the Enterprise Performance Life Cycle (EPLC) processes in developing and enhancing the EA Framework, collecting and populating data in the EA Repository, and developing views, reports, and analytical tools that can be used to facilitate the execution of the EPLC processes. The EPLC conceptual diagram in the figure provides a Departmental perspective of key business functions. The EPLC is also relevant from an individual investment or project perspective, as each new investment passes through each phase of the EPLC. The investment-level perspective is detailed in the Enterprise Performance Life Cycle Framework.

== See also ==
- Business analysis
- Enterprise architecture planning
- Enterprise modeling
- Organizational life cycle
- Product lifecycle management
- Service-oriented modeling life cycle
- Software lifecycle processes
- Systems development life cycle
- Technology life cycle
- Whole-life cost
- Enterprise integration
