= Dragon1 =

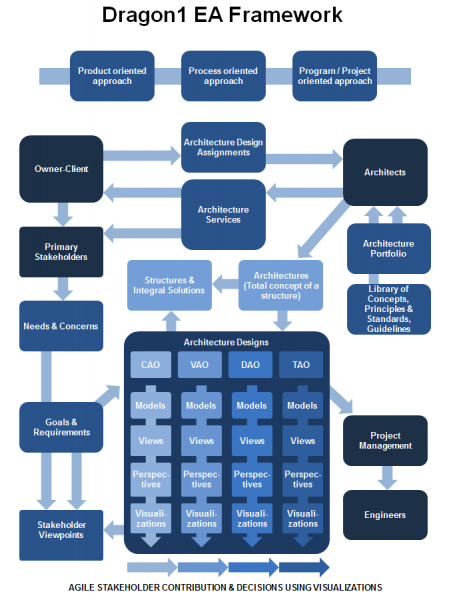
Dragon1 Architecture Framework

Dragon1 EA Method (Dragon1) is an open method for visual enterprise architecture and enterprise architecture framework. Dragon1 covers the development of a variety of architectures, such as enterprise, governance, business, information and technical architecture. It also covers solution architecture, reference architectures and security architecture or Human Capital Architecture (HCA).

== Overview ==
Dragon1, an open EA method for visual enterprise architecture, has been developed by Dragon1 Architecture Foundation, from the experience of practicing architecture on projects for clients across Europe. The first version was released in 2003 and was based on the ideas of Mark Paauwe about enterprise architecture, architecture visualization and architecture principles.

Dragon1 EA Method is said to be the following:

- A complete method (Way of Thinking, Way of Working, Way of Representing, and Way of Supporting) to create architecture products (The Open Group)
- Usable as add-on to other enterprise architecture frameworks and modelling standards
- Promoting architecture as a total concept design discipline
- Focusing architects on producing visual architecture products
- Creating visual architecture products for strategic decision support
- Using visualizations for the collection of stakeholder requirements
- Suited for guiding fundamental strategic enterprise transformations
- Recognized by ISO
- A recognized architecture method in The Open Group’s IT Architect Certification program (ITAC).

Dragon1 is an open method with a documented process for managing RFC from user community to implementation in the methods body of knowledge.

== Key definitions ==
The Dragon1 view of architects, architecture, structure, and architecture principles differs from that held by mainstream enterprise architecture approaches as it specifies the fundamental roles and purpose of principles and its guiding and defining purpose in the generation of architecture visualization and architecture design.

- Architects in Dragon1 are designers of "total-concepts";
- Enterprise architecture (the total concept of the enterprise) is the coherent set of constructive, operative and decorative business, information & information technology concepts that constitute an enterprise-structure;
- Principles are the enforced way things work, producing results;
- Architecture principles are the way concepts (as part of architecture) integrally work producing the results.

== Community ==
Dragon1 is a living open EA method that originated in the Netherlands.

- In the Netherlands, there are 200+ companies and 1000+ people using the method. Monthly, there is a user community meeting. Current work groups in the community are Business Requirements, Architecture Principles, Business Concepts Library and Big Data. These work groups focus on the methods for these topics.
- In other countries, such as England, Wales, Belgium and Suriname, the method is starting to be used by governments and commercial organizations.
