= Steven Spewak =

American management consultant

Steven Howard Spewak (1951 – March 26, 2004) was an American management consultant, author, and lecturer on enterprise architectures, known for the development of Enterprise Architecture Planning (EAP).

== Biography ==
Born in Philadelphia, Spewak earned both his B.A. and his M.A. degree at Case Western Reserve University, and earned his Ph.D. in business administration at the University of Michigan in 1981 with the thesis "Analysis of dynamics of the logical design of information systems".

Early 1980s Spewak started his career in industry. In 1986 he became software editor at Continental Insurance, where he headed a data modeling project. Early 1990s he started his management consultant practice with offices in Princeton, N.J., and Washington. He worked with government agencies, and national and international organizations, and was a frequent lecturer on enterprise architecture planning.

Spewak has been the Chief Technical Editor of the "Data Resource Management Journal" and "Database Management Information Service". He died on 26 April 2004 in Alexandria VA, at the age of 53.

== Work ==
=== Enterprise Architecture Planning ===
Levels of Enterprise Architecture Planning.

In his 1992 book Enterprise Architecture Planning (EAP), Spewak defined Enterprise Architecture Planning as "the process of defining architectures for the use of information in support of the business and the plan for implementing those architectures". Enterprise Architecture Planning is based on the Business Systems Planning (BSP) approach developed by John Zachman in the 1980. It takes a business-oriented approach to architecture planning to provide:

- data quality,
- access to data,
- adaptability to changing requirements,
- data interoperability and sharing, and
- cost containment.

The ultimate goal of an Enterprise Architecture is to define practical and implementable application and technology projects along with those projects required to prepare the organization for its future IT environment. This view counters the more traditional view that applications should be defined before data needs are determined or provided for.

Spewak’s approach to Enterprise Architecture Planning is similar to that taken by DOE in that the business mission is the primary driver. That is followed by the data required to satisfy the mission, followed by the applications that are built using that data, and finally by the technology to implement the applications. This hierarchy of activity is represented in the figure on the right, in which the layers are implemented in order, from top to bottom.

His approach to Federal Enterprise Architecture has helped organizations with modeling, business strategy planning, process improvement, data warehousing, and various support systems designs, data administration standards, object-oriented and information engineering methodologies, and project management. The Enterprise Architecture Planning (EAP) methodology is beneficial to understanding the further definition of the Federal Enterprise Architecture.

=== Enterprise Architects, Inc. ===
Spewak was founding partner of Enterprise Architects, Inc. Along with two partners, Frank Digaetano and Stephan DeVocht he tutored several generations of Enterprise Architects, and performed many consulting assignments for Fortune 500 clients, US and Canadian Federal Government organizations, as well as State, Local and Tribal government bodies.

Since the publication of his seminal book, he and his partners introduced enhancements to the EAP methodology such as updates for technology architecture, expansion of implementation requirements, and methods for calculating planning project duration and effort. They also developed a planning tool (EAP Toolset Templates), and the StratTac Group LLC Planning Templates, to assist organizations EAP efforts.

== Publications ==
Spewak authored and co-authored several books, papers and articles on enterprise architecture and related topics. A selection:

- 1981. Analysis of dynamics of the logical design of information systems. University of Michigan.
- 1993. Enterprise Architecture Planning: Developing a Blueprint for Data, Applications, and Technology. With S. C. Hill. Boston, QED Pub. Group.

Articles, a selection

- 1980. "A pragmatic approach to database design," VLDB '80 Proceedings of the sixth international conference on Very Large Data Bases. Vol 6. p. 151-152
- 1987. "Introducing Data Administration into a Business Organization". With Susan E. Smylie et al. in: Proceedings of the Sixth International Conference on Entity-Relationship Approach. p. 47-51
- 1992. "Developing a Blueprint for Data, Applications and Technology: Enterprise Architecture Planning," QED Technical Publishing Group
- 2006. "Updating the Enterprise Architecture Planning Model". With M. Tiemann. Journal of Enterprise Architecture, May 2006. p. 11-19
