= Queensland Government Enterprise Architecture =

The Queensland Government Enterprise Architecture (now known as the QGEA 2.0) is an initiative of the Queensland Government Chief Information Office (QGCIO) in Australia. QGEA 2.0 is the collection of ICT policies and associated documents that guides agency ICT initiatives and investments to improve the compatibility and cost-effectiveness of ICT across the government. The QGEA provides the decision making and management structures to support the development of better services for Queenslanders, more efficient and effective use of information and ICT in government and effective partnering with the private sector through the application of whole-of-Government, cross agency and agency information and information communications technology policies and practices.

== Description ==
The QGEA is a tailored EA which delivers a comprehensive set of processes, frameworks, policies, guidelines and tools to describe how the Queensland Government organises its resources to support service delivery.

The QGEA assists agencies, multi-agency projects, shared service providers and whole-of-Government initiatives to:

- deliver services in a coordinated, cost effective and efficient manner
- improve the integration and alignment of decision making across the Queensland Government
- support coordinated decision making about strategic directions, policies and standards
- use information and ICT to achieve their business objectives
- guide the development, use, and management of information and ICT resources over time
- position themselves for future needs.

The QGEA is a federated architecture, which acknowledges that the Queensland Government is a single enterprise composed of autonomous agencies. Agencies are responsible for their own enterprise architectures, yet are able to leverage and contribute to whole of-Government architectures and investments through a single consistent framework. The current state assessment of each department's business, information, application and technology component assets (called the ICT Baseline reporting activity) enables ICT portfolio investment analysis both at the department and whole-of-Government level.

== History ==
The former Department of Communication and Information, Local Government, Planning and Sport commenced a project in early 1999 to define what was called at the time a Government Information Architecture with the aim of improving the interoperability of communication and information systems and the sharing of information resources across Queensland Government agencies.

Loosely based on the META Group Enterprise Architecture Service methodology the first version was published in May 2001.

After an internal review of IT management across the Queensland Government in 2005 this original effort was replaced by the expanded Government Enterprise Architecture (GEA). At the same time the notion of enterprise architecture became enshrined in legislation in the form of the Financial Management Standard. This became one of the first known examples of enterprise architecture being explicitly mandated by a government body.

In 2006, the first GEA alignment report was completed by all agencies. As recommended in the former Service Delivery Performance Commission's Review of ICT governance in the Queensland Government, the Queensland Government Chief Information Office and Queensland Government Chief Technology Office were established and assigned joint management of the GEA.

The QGEA 2.0 was developed in 2008 and released to agencies for consultation. "QGEA" was adopted in preference to "GEA" to better reflect it as a Queensland Government developed framework. The QGEA 2.0 was officially launched on 21 April 2009.

== See also ==
- Enterprise Architecture
- Federal Enterprise Architecture
