= SAP Enterprise Architecture Framework =

The SAP Enterprise Architecture Framework (EAF) is a methodology and toolset by the German multinational software company SAP. It is based on The Open Group Architecture Framework (TOGAF). The TOGAF Architecture Development Method is a generic method for architecture development, which is designed to deal with most system and organizational requirements. It is usually tailored or extended to suit specific needs.

== See also ==
- Enterprise architecture framework
- SAP ERP
