= Sherwood Applied Business Security Architecture =

Enterprise security architecture

SABSA (Sherwood Applied Business Security Architecture) is a model and methodology for developing a risk-driven enterprise information security architecture and service management, to support critical business processes. It was developed independently from the Zachman Framework, but has a similar structure. The primary characteristic of the SABSA model is that everything must be derived from an analysis of the business requirements for security, especially those in which security has an enabling function through which new business opportunities can be developed and exploited.

The process analyzes the business requirements at the outset, and creates a chain of traceability through the strategy and concept, design, implementation, and ongoing ‘manage and measure’ phases of the lifecycle to ensure that the business mandate is preserved. Framework tools created from practical experience further support the whole methodology.

The model is layered, with the top layer being the business requirements definition stage. At each lower layer a new level of abstraction and detail is developed, going through the definition of the conceptual architecture, logical services architecture, physical infrastructure architecture and finally at the lowest layer, the selection of technologies and products (component architecture).

The SABSA model itself is generic and can be the starting point for any organization, but by going through the process of analysis and decision-making implied by its structure, it becomes specific to the enterprise, and is finally highly customized to a unique business model. It becomes in reality the enterprise security architecture, and it is central to the success of a strategic program of information security management within the organization.

SABSA is a particular example of a methodology that can be used both for IT (information technology) and OT (operational technology) environments.

== SABSA matrix ==
	Assets (What)	Motivation (Why)	Process (How)	People (Who)	Location (Where)	Time (When)
Contextual	The business	Business risk model	Business process model	Business organization and relationships	Business geography	Business time dependencies
Conceptual	Business attributes profile	Control objectives	Security strategies and architectural layering	Security entity model and trust framework	Security domain model	Security-related lifetime and deadlines
Logical	Business information model	Security policies	Security services	Entity schema and privilege profiles	Security domain definitions and associations	Security processing cycle
Physical	Business data model	Security rules, practices and procedures	Security mechanisms	Users, applications and user interface	Platform and network infrastructure	Control structure execution
Component	Detailed data structures	Security standards	Security products and tools	Identities, functions, actions and ACLs	Processes, nodes, addresses and protocols	Security step timing and sequencing
Operational	Assurance of operational continuity	Operational risk management	Security service management and support	Application and user management and support	Security of sites and platforms	Security operations schedule

Note: The above is the original SABSA Matrix, which is still valid today, but it has been expanded by a comprehensive service management matrix and updated in some detail and terminology areas. In the words of David Lynas, SABSA author, "The SABSA Matrix and the SABSA Service Management Matrix have not been updated since the late 90s. We have redesigned them to deliver the improvements your feedback has requested over the years. We have not fundamentally changed the structure or principles of the matrices (very few elements have changed position) but have focused on terminology update and consistency." The new versions can be downloaded (along with the 2009 revision of the SABSA White Paper and other important documents like the SABSA Certification Roadmap) at the SABSA Members' Web Site.
