= IT Architect Certification =

The IT Architect Certification is an independent global certification program for qualifying the skills, knowledge and experience of IT, Business and Enterprise Architects. This program was developed by The Open Group members in response to the growing demand for experienced IT architects. The Open Group, a vendor- and technology-neutral industry consortium, offers IT Architect Certification to certify skills and experience in the IT architecture community.

== The Program ==
The program is based on the proven best practices in the industry and sets an independent, industry-wide standard for IT Architects.

Under the program, practicing IT Architects can achieve the certification based on demonstrating substantial skills, experience and success in designing solutions across the whole lifecycle. In addition to certifying individuals directly, the program also provides accreditation of third-party IT architect certification programs. The skill and experience requirements for both the Direct Certification and the Accredited programs are the same. The first accredited program (IBM's) was announced in January 2006. In addition, a franchise option is available to professional societies and other eligible organizations. Accenture started in 2006 with a similar Master Technology Architect Certification Program to qualify and recognize professionals not just on expertise but also on experience and track record

=== Certification levels ===
Certification is available at two levels: Master Certified IT Architect (candidates must be able to perform independently and take responsibility for delivery of systems and solutions as lead architects), and Certified IT Architect (candidates must be able to perform with assistance/supervision, with a wide range of appropriate skills, as contributing architects).

==== Level 1 ====
Certified IT Architect candidate is able to perform with assistance/supervision, with a wide range of appropriate skills, as a contributing architect. Certified IT Architect Candidates must be practicing Enterprise / IT Architects and have at least two years' experience developing IT architectures with supervision; for example, through mentoring. They are expected to have the ability to produce architectures with occasional assistance from more experienced IT Architects (e.g., Master Level IT Architects).

==== Level 2 ====
Master IT Architect / Master Certified IT Architect - able to perform independently and take responsibility for delivery of systems and solutions as lead architect. Certified Master IT Architect Candidates must be practicing Enterprise / IT Architects and have at least three years recent experience of developing IT architectures. They must demonstrate having core foundation skills that include people skills, project management skills and architecture skills, and meet requirements related to experience, professional development, and contribution to IT Architecture community. All requirements must be documented in the application.

==== Level 3 ====
Distinguished IT Architect / Distinguished Certified IT Architect – effects significant breadth and depth of impact on the business via one of three advanced career paths: Chief/Lead Architect, Enterprise Architect or IT Architect Profession Leader.

IT Architects that have been certified are listed in a publicly available directory of Certified IT Architects.

== See also ==
- Software Architecture
- Information Technology
