= Open system (computing) =

Open systems are computer systems that provide some combination of interoperability, portability, and open software standards. (It can also refer to specific installations that are configured to allow unrestricted access by people and/or other computers; this article does not discuss that meaning).

The term was popularized in the early 1980s, mainly to describe systems based on Unix, especially in contrast to the more entrenched mainframes and minicomputers in use at that time. Unlike older legacy systems, the newer generation of Unix systems featured standardized programming interfaces and peripheral interconnects; third party development of hardware and software was encouraged, a significant departure from the norm of the time, which saw companies such as Amdahl and Hitachi going to court for the right to sell systems and peripherals that were compatible with IBM's mainframes.

The definition of "open system" can be said to have become more formalized in the 1990s with the emergence of independently administered software standards such as The Open Group's Single UNIX Specification.

Although computer users today are used to a high degree of both hardware and software interoperability, in the 20th century the open systems concept could be promoted by Unix vendors as a significant differentiator. IBM and other companies resisted the trend for decades, exemplified by a now-famous warning in 1991 by an IBM account executive that one should be "careful about getting locked into open systems".

However, in the first part of the 21st century many of these same legacy system vendors, particularly IBM and Hewlett-Packard, began to adopt Linux as part of their overall sales strategy, with "open source" marketed as trumping "open system". Consequently, an IBM mainframe with Linux on IBM Z is marketed as being more of an open system than commodity computers using closed-source Microsoft Windows—or even those using Unix, despite its open systems heritage. In response, more companies are opening the source code to their products, with a notable example being Sun Microsystems and their creation of the OpenOffice.org and OpenSolaris projects, based on their formerly closed-source StarOffice and Solaris software products.

== See also ==
- Open API
- Open format
- Open mainframe
- Open System Environment Reference Model
- Unix wars
