= NIST Enterprise Architecture Model =

Reference model for enterprise architecture

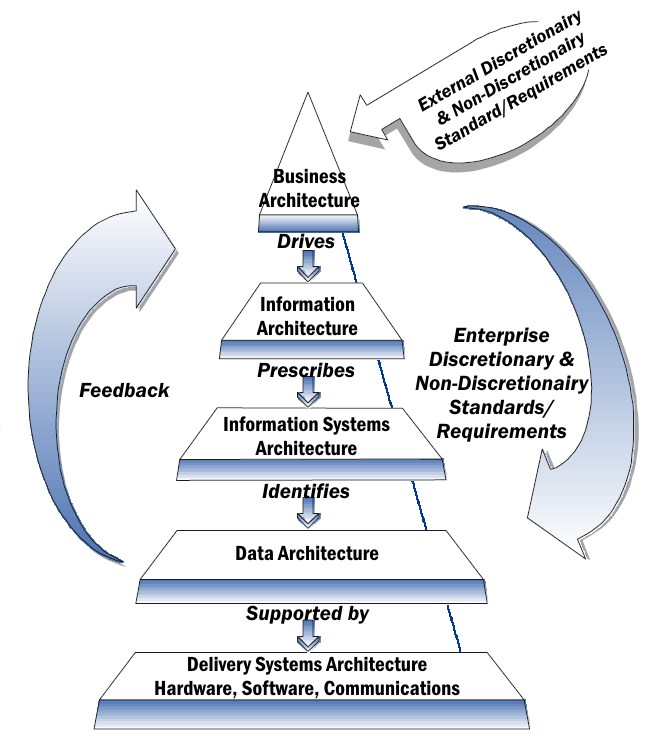
NIST Enterprise Architecture Model.

NIST Enterprise Architecture Model (NIST EA Model) is a late-1980s reference model for enterprise architecture. It defines an enterprise architecture by the interrelationship between an enterprise's business, information, and technology environments.

Developed late-1980s by the National Institute of Standards and Technology (NIST) and others, the federal government of the United States promoted this reference model in the 1990s as the foundation for enterprise architectures of individual U.S. government agencies and in the overall federal enterprise architecture.

== Intro ==
The NIST Enterprise Architecture Model is a five-layered model for enterprise architecture, designed for organizing, planning, and building an integrated set of information and information technology architectures. The five layers are defined separately but are interrelated and interwoven. The model defined the interrelation as follows:

- Business Architecture drives the information architecture
- Information architecture prescribes the information systems architecture
- Information systems architecture identifies the data architecture
- Data Architecture suggests specific data delivery systems, and
- Data Delivery Systems (Software, Hardware, Communications) support the data architecture.

The hierarchy in the model is based on the notion that an organization operates a number of business functions, each function requires information from a number of source, and each of these sources may operate one or more operation systems, which in turn contain data organized and stored in any number of data systems.

== History ==
The NIST Enterprise Architecture Model is initiated in 1988 in the fifth workshop on Information Management Directions sponsored by the NIST in cooperation with the Association for Computing Machinery (ACM), the IEEE Computer Society, and the Federal Data Management Users Group (FEDMUG). The results of this research project were published as the NIST Special Publication 500-167, Information Management Directions: The Integration Challenge.

=== The emerging field of information management ===
With the proliferation of information technology starting in the 1970s, the job of information management had taken a new light, and also began to include the field of data maintenance. No longer was information management a simple job that could be performed by almost anyone. An understanding of the technology involved, and the theory behind it became necessary. As information storage shifted to electronic means, this became more and more difficult.

The notion of a three-schema model was first introduced in 1975 by the ANSI/X3/SPARC three level architecture, which determined three levels to model data.

One of the first overall approaches to building information systems and systems information management from the 1970s was the three-schema approach. It proposes to use three different views in systems development, in which conceptual modelling is considered to be the key to achieving data integration:

- External schema for user views
- Conceptual schema integrates external schemata
- Internal schema that defines physical storage structures

At the center, the conceptual schema defines the ontology of the concepts as the users think of them and talk about them. The physical schema according to Sowa (2004) "describes the internal formats of the data stored in the database, and the external schema defines the view of the data presented to the application programs".

Since the 1970s the NIST had held a series of four workshops on Database and Information Management Directions. Each of the workshops addresses a specific theme:

- "What information about database technology does the manager need to make prudent decisions about using new technology", in 1975.
- "What information can help a manager assess the impact on a database system?" in 1977.
- "Information management tools from the standpoint of: uses; policies and controls; logical and physical database design" in 1980; and
- "The nature of information resource management practice and problems" in 1985.

The fifth workshop in 1989 was held by the National Computer Systems Laboratory (NCSL) of the NIST. By then this was one of the four institutes, that performed the technical work of the NIST. The specific goal of the NCSL was to conduct research and provide scientific and technical services to aid Federal agencies in the selection, acquisition, application, and use of computer technology.

=== NIST workshop on Information Management Directions ===
The fifth Information Management Directions workshop in 1989 focused on integration and productivity in information management. Five working groups considered specific aspects of the integration of knowledge, data management, systems planning, development and maintenance, computing environments, architectures and standards. Participants came from academia, industry, government and consulting firms. Among the 72 participants were Tom DeMarco, Ahmed K. Elmagarmid, Elizabeth N. Fong, Andrew U. Frank, Robert E. Fulton, Alan H. Goldfine, Dale L. Goodhue, Richard J. Mayer, Shamkant Navathe, T. William Olle, W. Bradford Rigdon, Judith A. Quillard, Stanley Y. W. Su, and John Zachman.

Tom DeMarco delivered the keynote speech, claiming that standards do more harm than good when they work against the prevailing culture, and that the essence of standardization is discovery, not innovation. The five working groups met to discuss different aspects of integration:

- the integration of knowledge and data management
- the integration of technical and business data management
- the integration of systems planning, development, and maintenance tools and methods
- the integration of distributed, heterogeneous computing environments, and
- architectures and standards.

In the third working group on systems planning was chaired by John Zachman, and adopted the Zachman Framework as a basis for discussion.

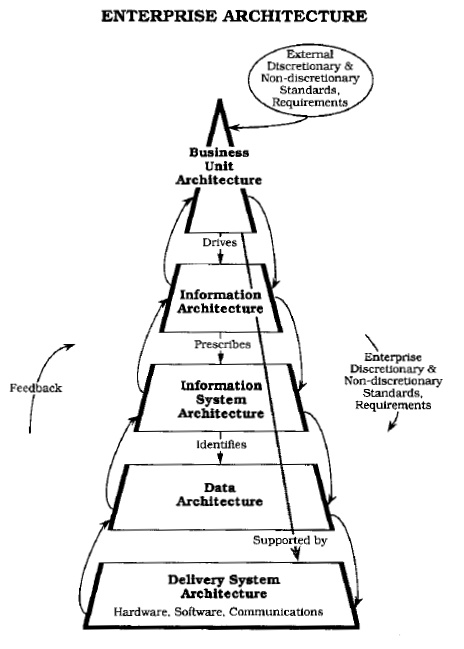
Model of Enterprise Architecture, 1989

The fifth working group on architectures and standards was chaired W. Bradford Rigdon of the McDonnell Douglas Information Systems Company (MDISC), a division of McDonnell Douglas. Rigdon et al. (1989) explained that discussions about architecture in that time mostly focus on technology concerns. Their aim was to "takes a broader view, and describes the need for an enterprise architecture that includes an emphasis on business and information requirements. These higher level issues impact data and technology architectures and decisions." In order to do so, the working group addressed three issues:

- The levels of architecture in an enterprise
- Problems addressed by architecture
- Benefits and risks of having architecture

To illustrate the levels of architecture, what has become known as the NIST Enterprise Architecture Model, was presented (see image). In this concept the three layers of the three-schema approach are divided into five layers.

=== Application in the 1990s ===
In a way the NIST Enterprise Architecture Model was ahead of his time. According to Zachman (1993) in the 1980s the "architecture" was acknowledged as a topic of interest, but there was still little consolidated theory concerning this concept. Software architecture, for example. become an important topic not until the second half of the nineties.

To support the NIST Enterprise Architecture Model in the 1990s, it was widely promoted within the U.S. federal government as Enterprise Architecture management tool. The NIST Enterprise Architecture Model is applied as foundation in multiple Enterprise Architecture frameworks of U.S. Federal government agencies and in the overall Federal Enterprise Architecture Framework. In coordinating this effort the NIST model was further explained and extended in the 1997 "Memoranda 97-16 (Information Technology Architectures)" issued by the US Office of Management and Budget., see further Information Technology Architecture.

== NIST Enterprise Architecture Model topics ==
=== Foundations ===
According to Rigdon et al. (1989) an architecture is "a clear representation of a conceptual framework of components and their relationship at a point in time". It may for example represent "a view of a current situation with islands of automation, redundant processes and data inconsistencies" or a "future integrated automation information structure towards which the enterprise will move in a prescribed number on years." The role of standards in architecture is to "enable or constrain the architecture and serve as its foundation".

In order to develop an enterprise architecture Rigdon acknowledge:

- There are multiple ways to develop an architecture
- There are multiple ways to implement standards
- Development and implementation should be customized to the environment
- Yet, every architecture itself can be divided into different levels.

The different levels of an enterprise architecture can be visualized as a pyramid: On top the business unit of an enterprise, and at the bottom the delivery system within the enterprise. The enterprise can consist of one or more business units, working in specific business area. The five levels of architecture are defined as: Business Unit, Information, Information System, Data and Delivery System.

The separate levels of an enterprise architecture are interrelated in a special way. On every level the architectures assumes or dictates the architectures at the higher level. The illustration on the right gives an example of which elements can constitute an Enterprise Architecture.

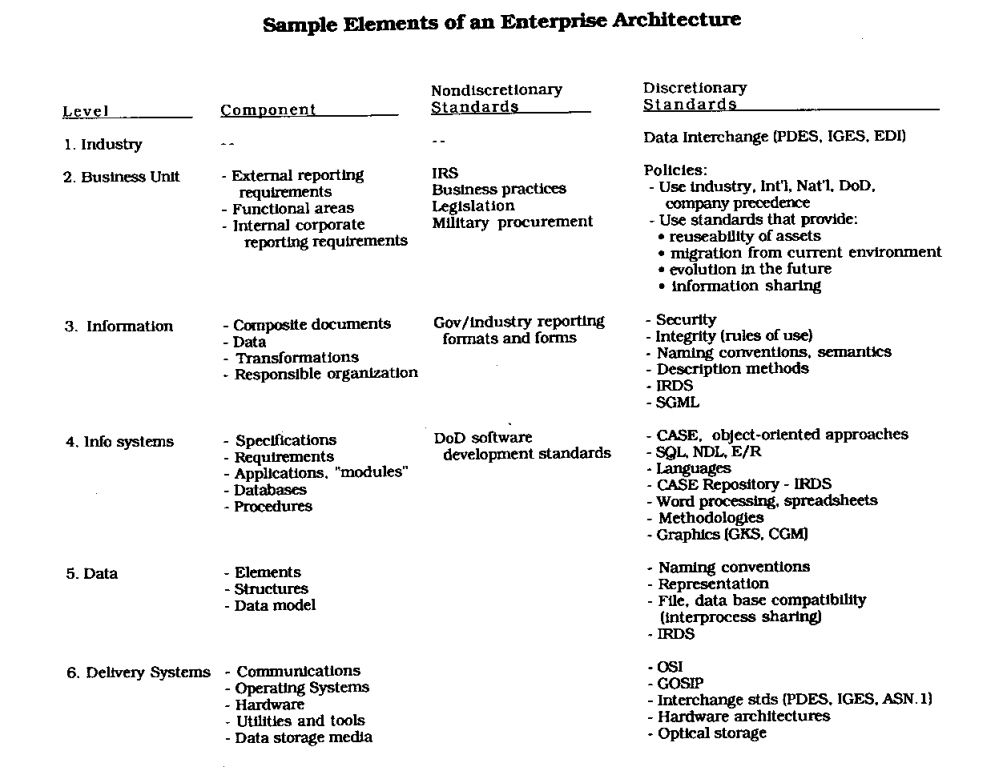
Sample elements of an Enterprise Architecture (1989).

=== Levels of architecture ===
Each layer of architecture in the model has a specific intention:

- Business Architecture level: This level can picture the total or a subunit of any corporation, which are in contact with external organizations.
- Information architecture level: This level specifies types of content, presentation forms, and format of the information required.
- Information systems architecture level: Specifications for automated and procedure-oriented information systems.
- Data Architecture level: Framework for maintenance, access and use of data, with data dictionary and other naming conventions.
- Data Delivery Systems level: Technical implementation level of software, hardware, and communications that support the data architecture.

Some sample elements of how the Enterprise Architecture can be described in more detail is shown in the illustration.

=== Information Technology Architecture ===
The "Memoranda 97-16 (Information Technology Architectures)" gave the following definition of enterprise architecture:

The Enterprise Architecture is the explicit description of the current and desired relationships among business and management process and information technology. It describes the "target" situation which the agency wishes to create and maintain by managing its IT portfolio.
The documentation of the Enterprise Architecture should include a discussion of principles and goals. (Note: Examples of published architectural "frameworks" include the Treasury Information System Architecture Framework (TISAF), the US Department of Defense Technical Architecture Framework for Information Management (TAFIM), and the Department of Energy's Information Architecture Volume 1.) For example, the agency's overall management environment, including the balance between centralization and decentralization and the pace of change within the agency, should be clearly understood when developing the Enterprise Architecture. Within that environment, principles and goals set direction on such issues as the promotion of interoperability, open systems, public access, end-user satisfaction, and security.

In this guidance the five component model of the NIST was adopted and further explained. Agencies were permitted to identify different components as appropriate and to specify the organizational level at which specific aspects of the components will be implemented. Although the substance of these components, sometimes called "architectures" or "sub-architectures," must be addressed in every agency's complete Enterprise Architecture, agencies have great flexibility in describing, combining, and renaming the components, which consist of:

- Business Processes: This component of the Enterprise Architecture describes the core business processes which support the organization's missions. The Business Processes component is a high-level analysis of the work the agency performs to support the organizations's mission, vision, and goals, and is the foundation of the ITA. Analysis of the business processes determine the information needed and processed by the agency. This aspect of the ITA must be developed by senior program managers in conjunction with IT managers. Without a thorough understanding of its business processes and their relation to the agency missions, the agency will not be able to use its ITA effectively.
  Business processes can be described by decomposing the processes into derivative business activities. There are a number of methodologies and related tools available to help agencies decompose processes. Irrespective of the tool used, the model should remain at a high enough level to allow a broad agency focus, yet sufficiently detailed to be useful in decision-making as the agency identifies its information needs. Agencies should avoid excessive emphasis on modeling business processes, which can result in a waste of agency resources. (Note: The US Department of Defense includes aspects of the Business Processes element in its Operational Architecture; the US Department of Treasury incorporates it into its business view.)
- Information Flows and Relationships: This component analyzes the information utilized by the organization in its business processes, identifying the information used and the movement of the information within the agency. The relationships among the various flows of information are described in this component. These information flows indicate where the information is needed and how the information is shared to support mission functions. (Note: The US Department of Agriculture has incorporated this component into its Business Architecture, while the US Department of Defense and Treasury have built it into their Operational Architectures.)
- Applications : The Applications component identifies, defines, and organizes the activities that capture, manipulate, and manage the business information to support mission operations. It also describes the logical dependencies and relationships among business activities. (Note: The US Department of Energy incorporates Business Applications into its Applications Subarchitecture, while the US Department of Treasury includes them in its Functional Architecture.)
- Data Descriptions: This component of the Enterprise Architecture identifies how data is maintained, accessed, and used. At a high level, agencies define the data and describe the relationships among data elements used in the agency's information systems. The Data Descriptions and Relationships component can include data models that describe the data underlying the business and information needs of the agency. Clearly representing the data and data relationships is important for identifying data that can be shared corporately, for minimizing redundancy, and for supporting new applications (Note: The US Department of Agriculture has included in this element in its Business/Data Architecture, while the US Department of Treasury incorporates it in its Information Architecture.)
- Technology Infrastructure : The Technology Infrastructure component describes and identifies the physical layer including, the functional characteristics, capabilities, and interconnections of the hardware, software, and communications, including networks, protocols, and nodes. It is the "wiring diagram" of the physical IT infrastructure. (Note: The US Department of Agriculture had incorporated this architecture into its Technical Standard and Telecommunications Architectures. US DoD uses its System Architecture, and US Treasury its Infrastrucsture to describe the physical layer.)

With the exception of the Business Processes component, the interrelationships among and priorities of these components are not prescribed by this guidance; there is no hierarchy of relationships implied. Furthermore, agencies should document not only their current environment for each of these components, but also the target environment that is desired.

== Applications ==
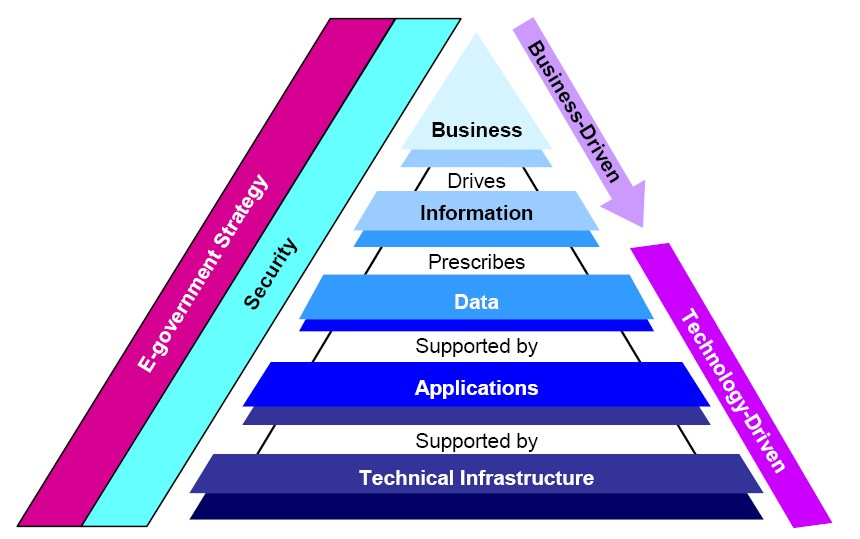
FDIC EA Framework.

The NIST Framework was picked up by several U.S. federal agencies and used as the basis for their information strategy. The reference model is applicated the following frameworks:

- Department of Energy (DOE) Information Architecture
- FDIC Enterprise Architecture Framework is the Enterprise Architecture framework of the Federal Deposit Insurance Corporation (FDIC).
- Federal Enterprise Architecture Framework (FEAF) : The 1999 documentation of the Federal Enterprise Architecture Framework Version 1.1 explains how the NIST Framework is used as a foundation of the FEA Framework.
- NWS Enterprise Architecture : Enterprise Architecture of the National Weather Service

== See also ==
- Application Portability Profile (APP)
- History of business architecture
- Open-system environment reference model
- Technical Architecture Framework for Information Management (TAFIM)
- Treasury Information System Architecture Framework
