= MESC =

System of standard codes for materials

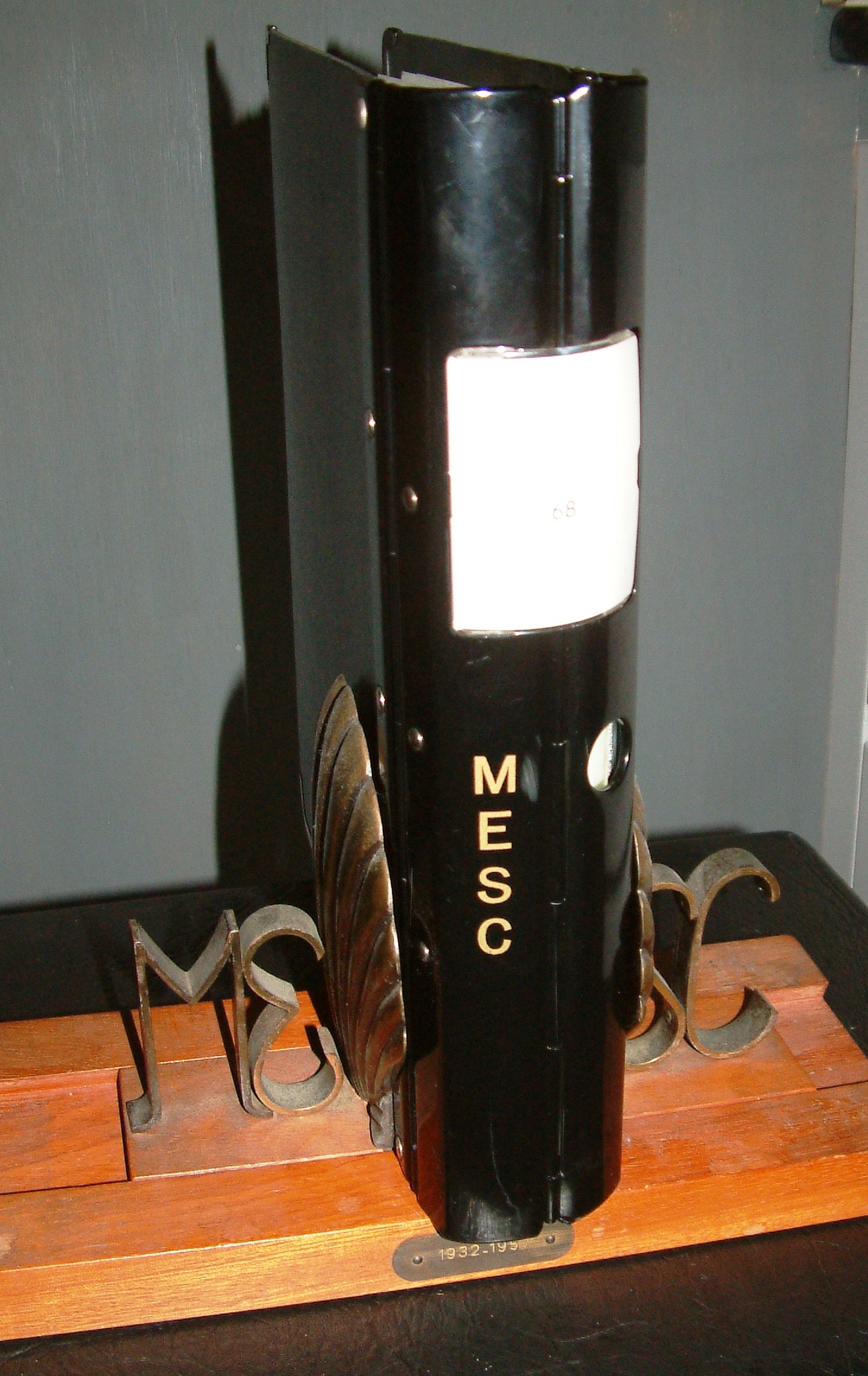
Group 68 the Shell MESC

The acronym MESC stands for Material and Equipment Standards and Code. It is a tool of the materials department for standardisation and handling of materials used in business. It was created in 1932 for internal use by Shell, but later on licensed to every company who wished to pay for it.

The system is a catalogue of specifications in the English language, to allow buyers to purchase standardised materials all over the world.

When MESC was initially introduced, materials were allocated a unique 7-digit number. This was increased to ten digits in 1946. The system has a numerical "coding schedule" of 10 digits to code the materials. It consists of groups, sub- and sub-sub-groups of 2 digits each, and a "Buying description" of 3 digits. Local coding is allowed for every company. The last digit for central coded materials is a 1, the last digit for local coded materials is a 9. With a single 10 digit code materials can be purchased all over the world, independent of the manufacturer or brand.

Typical example: Somewhere in the world a buyer purchases 500 metre cable coded 68.68.61.301.1 He knows he gets a telecommunication cable, 110 volt, polythene isolated, lead sheathed and steelwire armed, PVC served, colour green, with conductors of high-conductivity solid plain annealed copper wire, polythene insulated and polythene inner sheath, grouped 1x4x0,8 mm according to a strict specification and known measures.

It does not matter whether the buyer works on a Shell refinery in Oman or a BP plant in Rotterdam Europort, it only depends on the local market which supplier will supply the cable.

A cable coded 68.68.61.301.9 would be the same cable as 68.68.61.301.1, but with local requirements, e.g. according to the local colour standard.

The loose-leaf paper version of the MESC consisted of approximately two metre books.
