= W. Bradford Rigdon =

American business executive

Warren Bradford "Brad" Rigdon
- Born: Warren Bradford Rigdon; 1938 (age 86–87); United States
- Other names: Brad
- Education: University of Missouri
- Occupation: Business executive
- Known for: Developing the NIST Enterprise Architecture Model

Warren Bradford "Brad" Rigdon (born 1938) is an American former business executive at McDonnell Douglas, also known for developing the NIST Enterprise Architecture Model.

== Early life and education ==
Rigdon obtained his BA in business administration at the University of Missouri in 1961.

== Career ==
After graduation in 1961 Rigdon started his 30 years long career at McDonnell Douglas in the McDonnell Automation Company (McAuto) division. By 1966, he was a senior consultant. He then held a variety of management positions in systems services and marketing in New York, including Regional Director of the Northeast Region. he had also been a Director of Product Management, and Director of Business Applications for McAuto in long Beach.

In 1980 he was named Director of McDonnell Douglas Corporation, in 1983 Vice President of the MDC Service organization at McAuto, in 1986 General Manager of McDonnell Douglas Aerospace Information Services Company (MDAIS). In 1988 he is appointed senior vice president of special projects at McDonnell Douglas Information Systems, St. Louis, a division of McDonnell Douglas Corp. From 1989 until his retirement early 1990s he was Senior Vice President of R&D.

Rigdon was also a member of the Executive Committee of the Regional Consortium for Education and Technology, Chairman of the Science and Engineering Committee of the St. Louis Regional Commerce and Growth Association, a member of the University of Pennsylvania Wharton School Management Information Forum and a member of the Board of Catholic Education of the Archdiocese of St. Louis.

== Work ==
Rigdon summarized his work experience as "planning, performing and managing internal and commercial projects and organizations which determine user objectives and develop and deliver information technology-based solutions which support user requirements and improve user effectiveness."

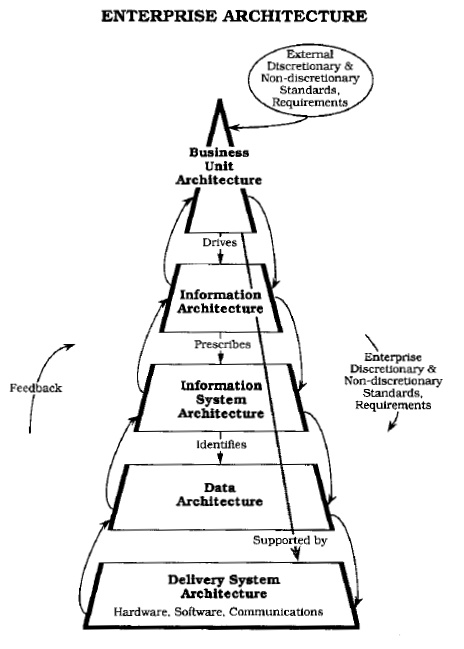
Model of Enterprise Architecture, 1989

=== McDonnell Douglas ===
At McDonnell Douglas Rigdon had planned, managed and reviewed software development, and was responsible for some of the corporate information, processing and communications systems. In his years he "helped build the commercial information systems business from a $50M operation to a $1.8B operation."

=== Enterprise architecture ===
In 1989 Rigdon chaired the "Architectures and Standards" working group of the NIST Information Management Directions conference, which developed the NIST Enterprise Architecture Model.

A discussion of architecture must take into account different levels of architecture. These levels can be illustrated by a pyramid, with the business unit at the top and the delivery system at the base. An enterprise is composed of one or more Business Units that are responsible for a specific business area. The five levels of architecture are Business Unit, Information, Information System, Data and Delivery System. The levels are separate yet interrelated... The idea if an enterprise architecture reflects an awareness that the levels are logically connected and that a depiction at one level assumes or dictates that architectures at the higher level.

== Selected publications ==
- Tattini, E. L., Stormfeltz, H. B., Smith, B. M., Rigdon, W. B., McGrath, M. F., Lepisto, B., ... & Adams, C. R. (1988). "Presentations at CALS Conference (Computer-Aided Acquisition and Logistic Support). Phase 1.1. Core Requirements Held in Gaithersburg, Maryland on April 26, 1988." National Bureau of Standards (NEL), Gaithersburg, MD. Support Office.
- W. Bradford Rigdon (1989) "Architectures and Standards". In: Information Management Directions: The Integration Challenge E.N. Fong and A.H. Goldfine (eds). NIST Sept 1989.
