= John Zachman =

American computer scientist

John A. Zachman
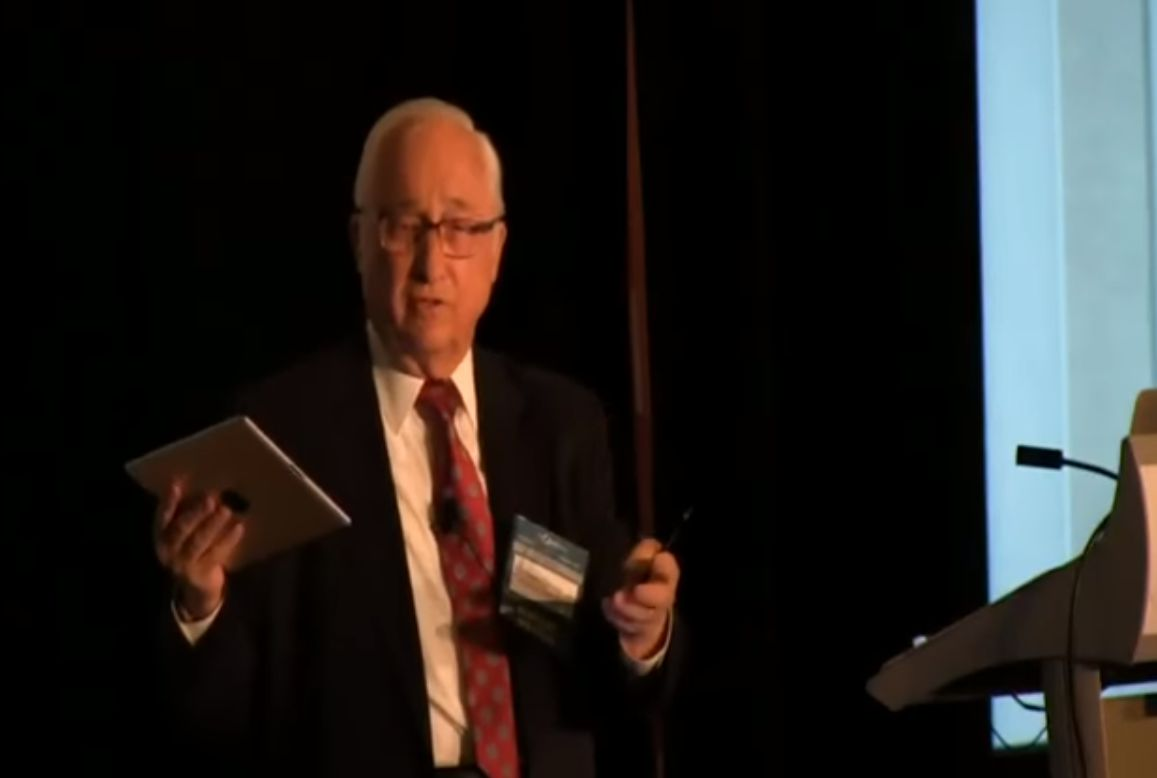
- John A. Zachman. Introduction to Enterprise Architecture, 11 February 2015
- Born: December 16, 1934 (age 91)
- Education: Northwestern University
- Occupations: business and IT consultant

John A. Zachman (born December 16, 1934) is an American business and IT consultant, early pioneer of enterprise architecture, chief executive officer of Zachman International (Zachman.com), and originator of the Zachman Framework.

== Biography ==
Zachman holds a degree in Chemistry from Northwestern University. He served for a number of years as a line officer in the United States Navy, and is a retired Commander in the U.S. Naval Reserve.

He joined IBM Corporation in 1964 and held various marketing-related positions in Chicago, New York and Los Angeles. He became involved with Strategic Information Planning methodologies in 1970. and in 1973 he was assigned responsibility for the Business Systems Planning (BSP) program in IBM’s Western Region. In 1984 he began to concentrate on information systems architecture. In 1989 at IBM he joined the CASE Support organization of the Application Enabling Marketing Center, where he worked as a consultant in areas of information systems planning and enterprise architecture. He retired at IBM in 1990, having served them for 26 years. Afterwards he co-founded, with Samuel B. Holcman, the Zachman Institute for Framework Advancement, which was discontinued in December 2008.

He is a Fellow for the College of Business Administration of the University of North Texas. He serves on the Advisory Board for Boston University’s Institute for Leading in a Dynamic Economy (BUILDE), the Advisory Board for the Data Resource Management Program at the University of Washington and the Advisory Board of the Data Administration Management Association International (DAMA-I).

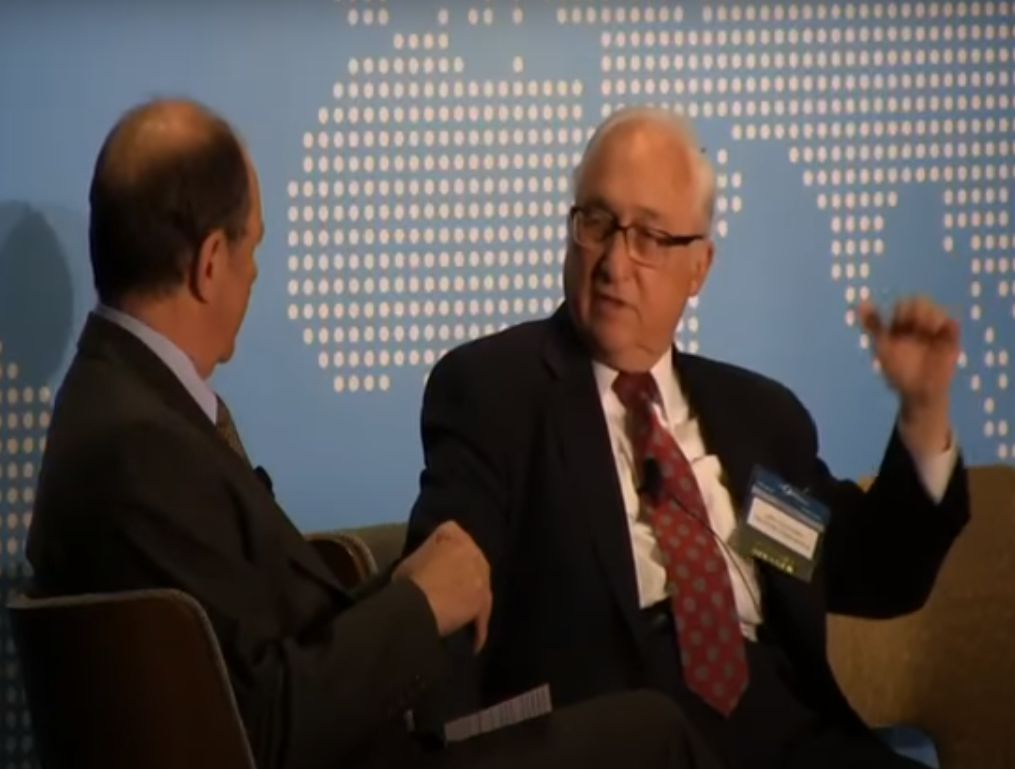
John A. Zachman. Introduction to Enterprise Architecture, 11 feb. 2015

In May 2002 he was awarded a Lifetime Achievement Award from the Advisory Board of the Data Administration Management Association International. He was awarded the 2004 Oakland University, Applied Technology in Business (ATIB), Award for IS Excellence and Innovation.

== Work ==
John Zachman is one of the founding developers of IBM's Business Systems Planning (BSP), and worked on their Executive team planning techniques (Intensive Planning). In 1987 he originated the Zachman Framework a standard for classifying the descriptive representations (models) that comprise enterprise architecture.

=== Business Systems Planning ===
Business System Planning (BSP) is a method for analyzing, defining and designing an information architecture of organizations. It was first issued by IBM in 1981, though the initial work on BSP began in the early 1970s. At first, it was for IBM internal use only. Later it was made available to customers and this method became an important tool for many organizations. It is a very complex method dealing with data, processes, strategies, aims and organizational departments which are interconnected.

Business Systems Planning (BSP) and Business Information Control Study (BICS) according to Zachman (1982), are both "information system planning methodologies that specifically employ enterprise analysis techniques in the course of their analyses. Underlying the BSP and BICS analyses are the data management problems that result from systems design approaches that optimize the management of technology at the expense of managing the data". The methodologies have similarities and differences, and strengths and weaknesses. The "choice between using one or the other methodology is strongly influenced by the immediate intent of the study sponsor, tempered by the limiting factors currently surrounding the BICS methodology".

=== Zachman Framework ===
The Zachman Framework according to Zachman (2008) is "a schema – the intersection between two historical classifications that have been in use for literally thousands of years".

- "The first is the fundamentals of communication found in the primitive interrogatives: What, How, When, Who, Where, and Why. It is the integration of answers to these questions that enables the comprehensive, composite description of complex ideas".
- "The second is derived from reification, the transformation of an abstract idea into an instantiation that was initially postulated by ancient Greek philosophers and is labeled in the Framework: Identification, Definition, Representation, Specification, Configuration and Instantiation. ..."

More specifically, the Zachman Framework is "an ontology – a theory of the existence of a structured set of essential components of an object for which explicit expressions is necessary and perhaps even mandatory for creating, operating, and changing the object (the object being an Enterprise, a department, a value chain, a "sliver," a solution, a project, an airplane, a building, a product, a profession of whatever)".

According to Zachman, "this ontology was derived from analogous structures that are found in the older disciplines of Architecture/Construction and Engineering/Manufacturing that classify and organize the design artifacts created in the process of designing and producing complex physical products (e.g. buildings or airplanes). It uses a two dimensional classification model based on the six basic interrogatives (What, How, Where, Who, When, and Why) intersecting six distinct perspectives, which relate to stakeholder groups (Planner, Owner, Designer, Builder, Implementer and Worker). The intersecting cells of the Framework correspond to models which, if documented, can provide a holistic view of the enterprise".

== Publications ==
Zachman had published three books, several articles and forewords to more than a hundred books on related subjects. A selection:

- 1997. Data stores, data warehousing, and the Zachman Framework : managing enterprise knowledge. With Bill Inmon and Jonathan G. Geiger. New York : McGraw-Hill.
- 2002. The Zachman Framework for Enterprise Architecture : A Primer on Enterprise Engineering and Manufacturing.
- 2016. "The Complete Business Process Handbook, Volume 2: Extended Business Process Management with Mark von Rosing & Henrik von Scheel, et al. (Morgan Kaufmann, ISBN 9780128028605)

Articles:

- 1978. "The Information Systems Management System: A Framework for Planning". In: DATA BASE 9(3): pp. 8–13.
- 1982. "Business Systems Planning and Business Information Control Study: A comparisment. In: IBM Systems Journal, vol 21, no 3, 1982. p. 31-53.
- 1987. "A Framework for Information Systems Architecture". In: IBM Systems Journal, vol. 26, no. 3, 1987. IBM Publication G321-5298.
- 1992. "Extending and Formalizing the Framework for Information Systems Architecture" with John F. Sowa In: IBM Systems Journal, Vol 31, no.3, 1992. p. 590-616
- 2007. "Architecture Is Architecture Is Architecture". Paper Zachman International ( version).
