= Business systems planning =

Method of defining information architecture in organizations

Business systems planning (BSP) is a method of analyzing, defining and designing the information architecture of organizations. It was introduced by IBM for internal use only in 1981, although initial work on BSP began during the early 1970s. BSP was later sold to organizations. It is a complex method dealing with interconnected data, processes, strategies, aims and organizational departments.

BSP was a new approach to IA; its goals are to:

- Understand issues and opportunities with current applications
- Develop future technology supporting the enterprise
- Provide executives with direction and a decision-making framework for IT expenditures
- Provide information systems (IS) with a developmental blueprint

The result of a BSP project is a technology roadmap aligning investments and business strategy. BSP comprises 15 steps, which are classified into three sections by function.

== Preparation ==
=== Study authorization ===
The essential first step in BSP is to obtain authorization for the study from management or an interested department. A number of roles must agree on the purpose and range of the study:

- Managing director
  - May be a sponsor or team leader
  - Verifies and approves study results
- Sponsor
  - Provides financial support
- Team leader
  - Chooses team members (four to seven people)
  - Coordinates activities
  - Documents and implements study (usually longer than eight weeks)
  - Presents results to management
- Team member
  - Usually a department head
  - Analyzes and determines organizational information needs
  - Recommends future IS content
  - Presents results to management
- Secretary
  - Documents study
  - Assists team leader

=== Preparation ===
The second step is the team leader's study preparation. Its goal is to:

- Set timeframe
- Obtain documents
- Choose managers to interview
- Procure meeting and interview space
- Inform team members of:
  - Organizational functions
  - Organizational data-processing level

A product of this step is a lead study book with the above information, a study schedule, IT documents and diagrams.

=== Beginning ===
At the first meeting of the study, the sponsor explains the purpose and expected results of the study; the team leader presents the study plan, and the IT manager describes the current state and the role of IS in the organization.

== Analysis ==
The analysis is the most important part of BSP. The team searches for an appropriate organizational structure as it defines business strategy, processes and data classes and analyzes current information support.

=== Strategy ===
This step define strategic targets and how to achieve them within the organization:

- Adaptating to the customer's desires
- Centrally-planned reservations, stock, payments
- Improvements in checking in, shipping, presentation, advertising, partner relations and stock management
- New customers
- Noise reduction
- Paperless processes
- Product-portfolio expansion
- Loss and cost reduction
- Simplifying customer order cycle
- Transport coordination
- Upgrade of production line
- Updating information

The team works from these strategic targets. Organizational units are departments of the organization. Each department is responsible for a strategic target.

=== Processes ===
There are about 40-60 business processes in an organization (depending on its size), and it is important to choose the most profitable ones and the department responsible for a particular process. Examples include:

- Contact creation
- Hangaring
- Invoicing
- Monitoring
- Airplane coordination and service
- New-customer registration
- Service catalog creation
- Reservations
- Employee training
- Transfers
- Car rental

=== Data classes ===
There are usually about 30–60 data classes, depending on the size of the organization. Future IS will use databases based on these classes. Examples include:

- Accommodation
- Branches
- Corporation
- Customer
- Employee
- Invoice
- Load
- Airplane
- Purchase order
- Service catalog
- Supplier
- Vehicle

=== Information support ===
The purpose of this step is to check the applications used by an organization, evaluating the importance of each to eliminate redundancy.

=== Management discussion ===
In the final analytical step the team discusses its results with management to confirm (or refute) assumptions, provide missing information, reveal deficiencies in the organization and establish future priorities.

=== Issue results ===
All documents created during the analysis are collected, serving as a base for future information architecture. The organization classifies and dissects all identified problems; a list is made of the cause and effect of each problem, which is integrated into the future IS.

(marque)

== Conclusion ==
=== Defining information architecture ===
To define an organization's information architecture, it is necessary to connect the information subsystems using matrix processes and data classes to find appropriate subsystems. The organization then reorders processes according to the product (or service) life cycle.

=== Establishing IS-development priorities ===
A number of criteria (costs and development time, for example) establish the best sequence of system implementation. High-priority subsystems may be analyzed more deeply. This information is given to the sponsor, who determines which information subsystems will be developed.

=== Verifying study impact ===
An IS planning and management study should be conducted. When the organization has finished its work on processes and data classes, it should explore the functions and goals of the system with a list of requested departmental changes and a cost analysis.

=== Proposals ===
Final recommendations and plans are made for the organization during this step, which encompasses information architecture, IS management and information-subsystem development and includes costs, profits and future activities.

=== Presentation ===
This is the agreement of all interested parties (team, management and sponsor) on future actions.

=== Final step ===
The organization should establish specific responsibilities during the project's implementation. There is usually a controlling commission, ensuring consistency across the IS.

BSP, in addition to its value to IS planning, introduced the process view of a firm. The business process reengineering of the 1990s was built on this concept. It also demonstrated the need to separate data from its applications using it, supporting the database approach to software development methodology.

== Criticism ==
Research done in 1988 by Goodhue and colleagues found that BSP had limited utility due to the great expenses in time and resources required to implement the methodology. Authors Lederer and Sethi found came to similar conclusions in 1992 through preliminary reviews of a BSP study.
