= Departmentalization =

Process of grouping activities

Departmentalization (or departmentalisation) refers to the process of "grouping the organizational activities and structure into departments". Division of labour creates specialists who need coordination and the coordination is facilitated by grouping specialists together in departments.

== Popular types ==
=== Functional departmentalization ===
Functional departmentalization is "characterized by the arrangement of a bank’s activities along functional lines such as accounting, marketing, human resource management, training and development, research and development, among others".

=== Product departmentalization ===
Production, marketing, and often accounting activities related to one product are grouped under one department, with the product manager as the supervisor.

=== Customer departmentalization ===
Recognition of the unique needs of individuals, groups, or customers, coupled with management's commitment to reflecting that uniqueness in the delivery of products and services, may require structuring the organization according to different types of customers. It indicates the division of customers into subgroups and empowers managers to manage activities related to the satisfaction of specific groups of customers.

=== Territorial departmentalization ===
The adoption of sectorization of inherent territories includes;

1. the need to leverage economic localization
2. the need to minimize the costs in the geographic markets, and
3. reducing communication problems.

=== Mixed departmentalization ===
It is common for organizations to adopt mixed departmentalization, which involves the adoption of two or more forms of departmentalization.

=== Project departmentalization ===
Project departmentalization is mainly adopted by organizations engaged in contract jobs and other time-specific projects.

=== Matrix departmentalization ===
The matrix structure or departmentalization reflects both a functional and project orientation. It is essentially a superimposition of the project structure on the functional structure.

== Philosophical considerations ==
As March and Simon noted when tracing a first approach to departmentalization back to Aristotle, the problem of distributing work, authority and responsibility throughout an organization is hardly new.

In modern times, Gulick and Urwick were the first to introduce a theory of different departmentalization strategies, which were referred to as departmentalization by purpose and departmentalization by process.

Studying the above characterizations of the two forms of departmentalization, purpose decentralization is concerned with building work around specific products, customers, or geographic locations, while process departmentalization encompasses the efficiency of "production".

March and Simon described the basic difference between the two ways of departmentalization as following:

”Process departmentalization generally takes greater advantage of the potentialities for economy of specialization than does purpose departmentalization: purpose departmentalization leads to greater self-containment and lower coordination costs than process departmentalization.”

=== Departmentalization by purpose ===
==== Benefits ====
1. Self-containment tends to improve the ability for internal coordination within the unit.
2. The need for developing and maintaining extensive external coordination mechanisms is reduced.
3. Clearer focus on the purpose itself–serving a specific customer or market–is enabled.

==== Shortcomings ====
The sense of independence may result in a drift-off from the achievement of the overall objectives of the organization.

Therefore, it is crucial for establishing control systems that serve the purpose of allowing decentralized decisions, while still aligning all sub-units to the overall goals of the organization.

=== Departmentalization by process ===
==== Benefits ====
It seeks to benefit from the advantages that are found in high specialization, and tends to be very efficient in some instances. A high degree of specialization leads to the development of proficiency and professional competence, as well as it enables, and implies, the development of centralized control functions.

==== Shortcomings ====
The problem of aligning individual and organizational goals remains. In addition, in this case, we would also need to consider departmental goals. Also, the high level of specialization is a barrier for the flexible reallocation of resources within the organization, i.e. people can not perform other tasks than those they are working with in their functional occupation.

=== Applicability of each type ===
Looking at the circumstances encompassing the use of either of the departmentalization strategies, departmentalization by process is generally advantageous in cases of stable environments, while departmentalization by purpose, featuring self-containment and certain amounts of independence, appears to be the appropriate strategy for handling changing or unpredictable circumstances.

Alfred Chandler identified a correlation between the application of purpose departmentalization and the use of a diversification strategy:

”The dominant centralized structure had one basic weakness. A very few men were still entrusted with a great number of complex decisions. ... As long as an enterprise belonged in an industry whose market, sources of raw materials, and production processes remained relatively unchanged, few entrepreneurial decisions have to be reached. In that situation, such a weakness was not critical, but where technology, market, and sources of supplies were changed rapidly, the defect of such a structure became more obvious.”

== Recent trends ==
- The customer departmentalization has become increasingly emphasized.
- Rigid departmentalization is being complemented by the use of teams that cross over traditional departmental lines ("silos").
