= Rosenfeld =

Rosenfeld may refer to:

== Places ==
- Rosenfeld, Germany, a town in Baden-Württemberg
- Rosenfeld, Manitoba, a Canadian village in the Rural Municipality of Rhineland
- Rosenfeld, Texas, an unincorporated community in west central Brewster County
- Dr. James Rosenfeld House in southwest Portland, Oregon
- Heiser, Rosenfeld, and Strauss Buildings in Baltimore, Maryland

== Surname ==
- Albert Rosenfeld (1885–1970), Australian rugby league footballer
- Alexandra Rosenfeld (born 1986), elected "Miss France" in 2006
- Andrée Rosenfeld (1934–2008), Belgian rock art researcher and archaeologist
- Andrew Rosenfeld (1962–2015), British businessman
- Arthur Rozenfeld (born 1995), French basketball player in the Israeli Basketball Premier League
- Arthur H. Rosenfeld (1926–2017), energy conservationist
  - Rosenfeld Effect
  - Rosenfeld's law
- Azriel Rosenfeld (1931–2004), American informatics professor
- Bella Rosenfeld (1895–1944), Yiddish picture book writer
- Bobbie Rosenfeld (1904–1969), Canadian olympic athlete
  - Bobbie Rosenfeld Award, annual award given to Canada's female athlete of the year
  - Bobbie Rosenfeld Park in Toronto, Canada
- Bryan Rosenfeld (born 1965), Canadian soccer player and coach
- Dagmar Rosenfeld (born 1974), German journalist
- Daniel Rosenfeld (born 1989), German musician
- Else Rosenfeld (1891–1970), Holocaust survivor and author
- Eva Rosenfeld (1892–1977), German-British psychoanalyst
- Gastão Rosenfeld (1912–1990), Brazilian physician and biomedical scientist
- Gavriel David Rosenfeld, American historian
- Harry M. Rosenfeld (1929–2021), American newspaper editor
- Irene Rosenfeld (born 1953), American current CEO of Mondelēz International
- Isaac Rosenfeld (1918–1956), Jewish-American writer
- Jakob Rosenfeld (1903–1952), Austrian physician
- Jesse Rosenfeld (born 1983), Australian actor
- Jim Rosenfeld (born 1958), American local television news anchor
- Kenneth L. Rosenfeld an American criminal defense attorney.
- Leah Rosenfeld (1908–2006), American railroad telegraph operator, station agent, and trade unionist
- Léon Rosenfeld (1904–1974), Belgian physicist
  - Belinfante–Rosenfeld stress–energy tensor
- Lotty Rosenfeld (1943–2020), Chilean artist
- Lou Rosenfeld, American publisher specializing in design books
- Lucinda Rosenfeld (born 1969), American novelist
- Marina Rosenfeld, New York City experimental composer and turntablist
- Michael S. Rosenfeld (1934–2010), talent agent, movie producer, and co-founder of Creative Artists Agency
- Morris Rosenfeld (1862–1923), Yiddish playwright
- Morris Rosenfeld (1885–1968), maritime photographer
- Oskar Rosenfeld (1884–1944), Austrian-Jewish writer
- Otto Rosenfeld (disambiguation), several people
- Richard Rosenfeld (1948–2024), American criminologist and academic
- Roni Rosenfeld (born 1959), Israeli-American computer scientist
- Šandor Friedrich Rosenfeld (1872–1945), Austrian-Jewish writer
- Scott Ian Rosenfeld (born 1963), American metal rhythm guitarist
- Sharon Rosenfeld, real name of Filipina actress Nikka Valencia
- Stephen Rosenfeld (1932–2010), American journalist
- Win Rosenfeld (born 1978), American screenwriter and producer

== Other uses ==
- Rosenfeld (novel), a 2022 novel by Maya Kessler

== See also ==
- Rosenfelder
- Rosenfield
- Rozenfeld
