= Rozenfeld =

Rozenfeld is a surname. Notable people with the surname include:

- Arthur Rozenfeld (born 1995), French-Israeli professional basketball player
- Carina Rozenfeld (born 1972), French author
- Lev Borisovich Rozenfeld (1883–1936), Bolshevik revolutionary and a prominent Soviet politician
- Michał Rozenfeld (1916–1943), Jewish resistance activist during the Second World War
- Paweł Rozenfeld (1907–1939), Jewish industrialist (hosiery) from Łódź
- Shalom Rozenfeld (1800–1851), rabbi
- Yonah Rozenfeld (1880-1944), Yiddish-language author

== See also ==
- Rozenfeld and KO AD
- Staging Point (Rozenfeld)
- Rosenfeld (disambiguation)
