= Information Architecture Institute =

- Formation: 2002
- Dissolved: 2019
- Legal status: Dissolved
- Purpose: The IAI was a global organization that supported individuals and organizations specializing in the design and construction of shared information environments.
- Formerly called: Asilomar Institute for Information Architecture

The Information Architecture Institute (IA Institute or IAI) was a non-profit volunteer organization dedicated to advancing and promoting information architecture. The organization was incorporated in November 2002 and was a 501(c)(6) organization. It grew to become one of the world's largest professional groups for web specialists, with over 1200 members in 60 countries, It was dissolved in September 2019 and is no longer a professional board of trade.

The institute broadly defined "information architecture" as:

- The structural design of shared information environments.
- The art and science of organizing and labeling web sites, intranets, online communities and software to support usability and findability.
- An emerging community of practice focused on bringing principles of design and architecture to the digital landscape.

== Founding ==
The Information Architecture Institute was founded in 2002 by Peter Morville, Lou Rosenfeld, Erin Malone, Lisa Chan, Christina Wodtke, Andrew Hinton, Michael Angeles, Jesse James Garrett, Karl Fast, Thomas Vander Wal, Jess McMullin and Todd Wilkens. They originally named it the Asilomar Institute for Information Architecture, after the Asilomar Conference Grounds, where the founders first came up with the idea. The founding board, elected in 2002, consisted of Christina Wodtke, President, Lou Rosenfeld, Treasurer, Victor Lombardi, Secretary, Peter Morville and John Zapolski.

The IA Institute was created to replace a similar group called the Argus Center for Information Architecture (ACIA), which was closely associated with Argus Associates, a commercial information architecture consultancy.

During the first week of the creation of the Institute, 163 charter members joined. This number became 400 by August 2003. These members came from 26 countries. These first members were of crucial importance to make progress to the IAI's first projects:

- AIfIA Translations
- Metrics for IA
- Membership Directory
- Education Curriculum (supported by the M.S. Interaction Design and Information Architecture program at the University of Baltimore)
- F2F, a face-to-face project for IAfIA members meet-up
- Job Board

The Institute at its foundation, with its mission of advance in the field of shared information environments, defined goals for the first year:

- Bring value to practitioners of IA
- Advance in the field of information architecture
- Support these goals by creating sustainable infrastructure & operations

The Institute was founded with seed money from its founding members. Later sources of revenue included membership dues and seminars.

== Publications ==
The Journal of Information Architecture is an independent initiative of REG-iA, the Research & Education Group in IA. It published papers from 2009 through 2013 and was sponsored by the Information Architecture Institute and by Copenhagen Business School.

== Conferences ==
The IA Institute had its own IDEA Conference until 2010. In 2018, the IA Institute Board voted to be an executive sponsor for The IA Conference 2019.

== Controversy & Dissolution ==
On January 21, 2019, an attendee of the 2018 IA Summit in Chicago published an open letter to the information architecture community, alleging that her formal complaint against another attendee had been mishandled by the IA Institute.

On January 25, 2019, a Change.org petition called for the recall election of the Institute President at the time.

On March 20, 2019, former IA Institute President Eric Reiss filed a petition for discovery against the Institute. The case was dismissed two months later. However, that July, the board received a summons to appear in court, and the institute did not have the funds needed to hire representation.

In September 2019, the IA Institute announced its dissolution. According to the announcement, litigation was "not the absolute cause" of the decision. Remaining funds were transferred to World IA Day, Inc., which was formed less than a month after the IAI dissolution. The IA Institute was officially dissolved by the State Attorney's Office in Michigan on November 21, 2019.
