= Thomas Vander Wal =

American information architect

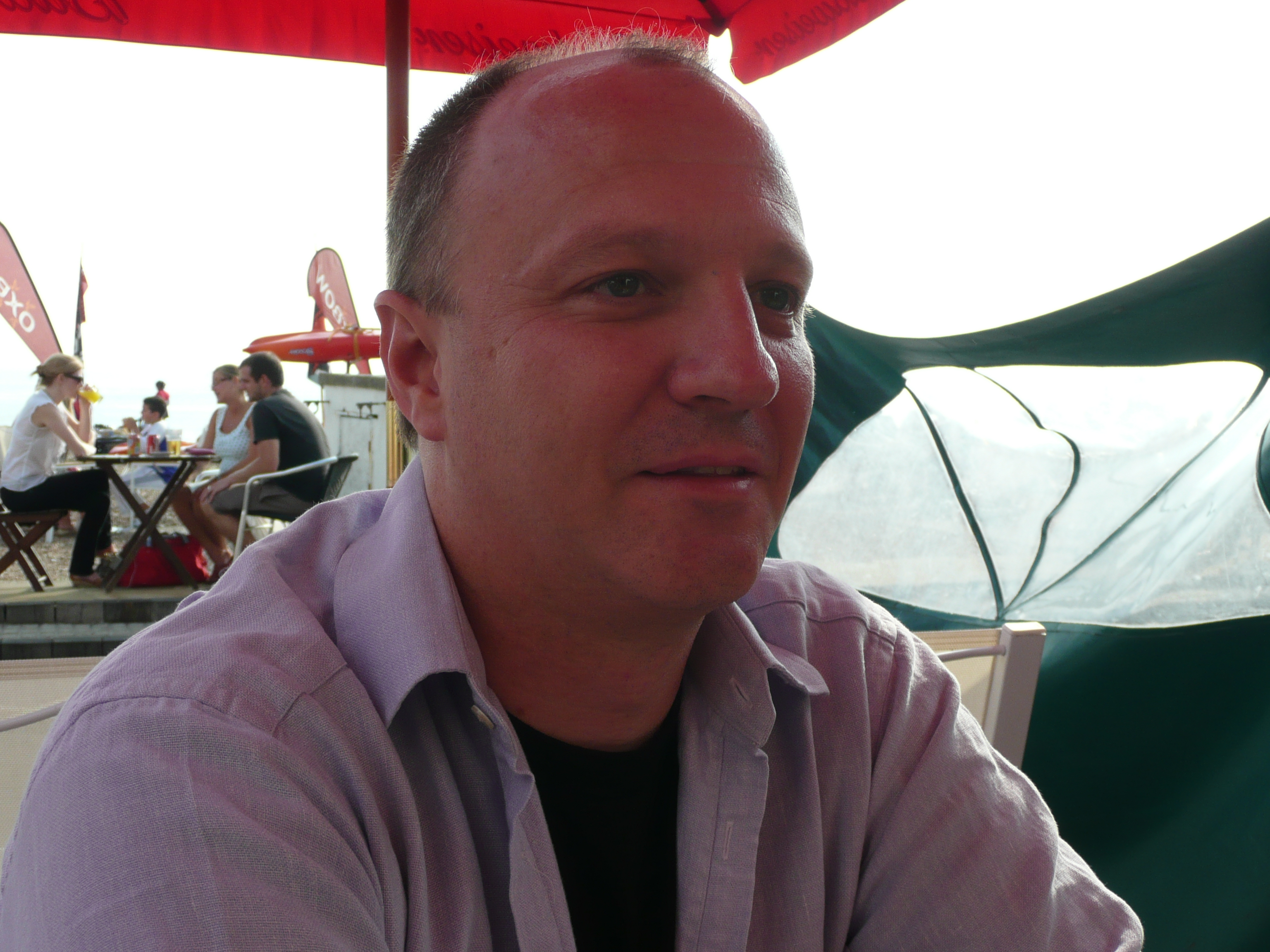
- Vander Wal in 2007
- Citizenship: American
- Education: Lincoln High School (Stockton, CA), Saint Mary's College of California, Centre for Medieval and Renaissance Studies (Oxford), Georgetown University’s Public Policy Institute
- Alma mater: Saint Mary's College of California; Georgetown University
- Occupations: Information architect, consultant
- Employer: INDUS Corporation
- Organization(s): InfoCloud Solutions (Principal and Senior Consultant)
- Known for: Coining the term "folksonomy", initiating the term "infocloud"
- Title: Principal and Senior Consultant
- Website: https://vanderwal.net/

Thomas Vander Wal is an American information architect best known for coining the term "folksonomy". He is also known for initiating the term "infocloud". His work has primarily dealt with the Web and with information design and structure especially in the context of social technology.

== Personal ==
Vander Wal attended high school at Lincoln High School in Stockton (California, USA), then went on to get his BA in communication at Saint Mary's College of California in Moraga. He has also attended the Centre for Medieval and Renaissance Studies in Oxford and holds a MPP from Georgetown University’s Public Policy Institute.

He currently lives in Bethesda, Maryland.

== Concepts ==
=== Folksonomy ===
Vander Wal is credited with coining the term “folksonomy’ in 2004. Folksonomy is sometimes called collaborative tagging, social classification, social indexing, or social tagging. It refers to taxonomies created by users applying their own tags to pieces of information (including articles, pictures, and websites). The tags aid users in categorizing information for both personal management and sharing with others. These user generated taxonomies stand in contrast to professionally created ontologies and taxonomies used for resource discovery and retrieval in more traditional knowledge organization systems.

=== Personal InfoCloud ===
The Personal InfoCloud is the information that a user collects, organizes, and carries with them, a bit like your personal slice of the web. Instead of focusing on very large and relatively public social spaces on the internet, the Personal InfoCloud represents a desire to use the internet to connect to a small group of people on a more personal level, and keep specific information accessible to that group. The point here is that the information needs to be accessible to the user in a very short amount of time. Thus, aggregation, personal organization and portability all flow from the need for accessibility. Vander Wal links the Personal InfoCloud to concepts like personal archiving, information overload, and what he calls the “Come to Me Web”.

=== Model of Attraction ===
Much of his work, including the Personal InfoCloud and folksonomies, is undergirded by what he calls the Model of Attraction. MoA is a metaphor, much like navigation or sense of smell, that helps information architects and web developers think about the way that users interact with information. To think about MoA in relation to folksonomies, certain terms are associated with different pieces of information. The strength of the association can be visualized as a magnetic field, bringing certain kinds of information around a term. When a user searches on that term, they enter into the magnetic field. To think about MoA in relation to the Personal InfoCloud, a user's associated information and interests create a similar magnetic field, which draws pertinent information to them, and keeps it around them.

== Professional experience ==
Vander Wal works at InfoCloud Solutions as the Principal and Senior Consultant. InfoClouds Solutions is Vander Wal's consulting company that advises on the range of digital content/media, folksonomy/tagging, social web, and personal to social information use and reuse.

He is a columnist at KM World, writes on his own blog “Off the Top” and he has worked for the INDUS Corporation in Bethesda, Maryland, is a member of the Founding Leadership Council for The Information Architecture Institute, and the Steering Committee for the Web Standards Project (WaSP). He is also the Alumni Tech Lead for Boxes and Arrows magazine.

He spoke at the Association of Alternative Newsweeklies Web convention in January 2008.
