= Peter Morville =

British businessman

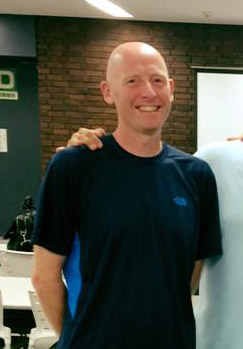
- Morville in 2015
- Education: Tufts University (B.A.); University of Michigan (MLIS)
- Occupation: Information Architect
- Known for: Information Architecture, User Experience Design
- Notable work: Information Architecture for the World Wide Web
- Board member of: Project Information Literacy; The Understanding Group; Rosenfeld Media
- Awards: Honorary Fellow, Society for Technical Communication; Alumni Achievement Award, University of Michigan; Roger Summit Award, AIIP; Webby Award, National Cancer Institute
- Website: semanticstudios.com

Peter Morville is president of Semantic Studios, an information architecture and findability consulting firm. He may be best known as an influential figure and "founding father" of information architecture, having coauthored the best-selling book in the discipline, Information Architecture for the World Wide Web. For over a decade, he has advised such clients as AT&T, Dow Chemical, Ford, the IMF, the Library of Congress, and Microsoft. Morville was a co-founder and past president of the Information Architecture Institute, and has served on their advisory board. He delivers keynotes and seminars at international events, and his work has been featured in major publications, including Business Week, Fortune, and The Wall Street Journal.

== Biography ==
Peter Morville was born in Manchester, England. He holds a graduate degree in Library and Information Science, having graduated from the University of Michigan School of Information in 1993. He has since served on their faculty and received an Alumni Achievement Award for his work in information science.

In the 1990s, together with Louis Rosenfeld, he headed Argus Associates, the consulting firm which supported one of the precursors of the Information Architecture Institute, the Argus Center for Information Architecture. The company began in January 1994 as a full-solution web design business, but Morville and Rosenfeld decided to specialize by applying principles of library science to solve issues of grouping and labeling on the early Web. The two dubbed their work "information architecture," although they did not mean it in the sense of Richard Saul Wurman's use of the term, who according to Morville, "focused on the presentation and layout of information on a two-dimensional page. We focused on the structure and organization of sites." Argus worked with clients such as AT&T, Borders Books and Music, and Microsoft.

In 1998, Morville and Rosenfeld co-authored Information Architecture for the World Wide Web, which was published by O'Reilly Media in 1998. This book, known as the "Polar Bear book" because of the Polar Bear on its cover, became a bestseller and was awarded Amazon.com's "best computer book of 1998." It has been described as the "seminal" book on information architecture. The book sparked enough of a growth in interest in information architecture that two years later, the Association for Information Science and Technology (ASIS&T) helped organize the first annual Information Architecture Summit.

Along with Christina Wodtke, Rosenfeld, and a number of other information architects, Morville co-founded the Information Architecture Institute in 2002 and subsequently served as its president. He has been an independent consultant since 2001 through his company Semantic Studios, which focuses on information architecture and user experience for a wide range of clients.

In 2024, Peter founded Sentient Sanctuary, a nonprofit think tank and animal sanctuary, and wrote a philosophical IA novel, Animals Are People. He blogs at intertwingled.org.

== Bibliography ==
- Morville, Peter; Rosenfeld, Louis (1998). Information Architecture for the World Wide Web. O'Reilly Media. ISBN 978-1-56592-282-2.
- Morville, Peter (2005). Ambient Findability. O'Reilly Media. ISBN 978-0-596-00765-2.
- Morville, Peter; Callender, Jeffery (2010). Search Patterns. O'Reilly Media. ISBN 978-0-596-80227-1.
- Morville, Peter (2014). Intertwingled: Information Changes Everything. Semantic Studios. ISBN 978-0692225585.
- Morville, Peter (2018). Planning for Everything: The Design of Paths and Goals. Semantic Studios. ISBN 978-0692059951.
- Morville, Peter (2024). Animals Are People. Semantic Studios. ISBN 979-8991363303.
