= JJG =

JJG may refer to:

- Jaguaruna Regional Airport, in Brazil
- Jean-Jacques Goldman (born 1951), French musician
- Jesse James Garrett, American user experience designer
