= Rosenfelder =

Rosenfelder is a surname. Notable people with the surname include:

- Charles Rosenfelder, American football player
- Ludwig Rosenfelder, German painter
- Mark Rosenfelder, American conlanger

== See also ==
- Rosenfeld (disambiguation)
