= Project Information Literacy =

US research institute

Project Information Literacy (PIL) was a research institute conducting national scholarly studies between 2008 and 2025 on how early adults find and use information as they progress through, and beyond, their higher education years at an unprecedented time of rapid technological change.

== Organization ==
Based in California's San Francisco Bay Area, Project Information Literacy, Inc. (PIL) was a public benefit 501(c)(3) organization registered in California. Alison J. Head, PhD., who was the Executive Director and Lead Researcher, is an expert in the field of information literacy research and new media.

PIL began in 2008 as a partnership with the University of Washington Information School with Alison J. Head and Michael Eisenberg, dean emeritus and professor at the school, as Co-Directors. Both Head and Eisenberg have extensive experience conducting and publishing research on information literacy and the information-seeking behavior of Internet users. In 2012, PIL became a registered nonprofit with Head as sole director after Dr. Head first became affiliated with the Berkman-Klein Center for Internet & Society and the Library Innovation Lab as a Fellow in 2011. In 2016, Dr. Head ended PIL’s formal relationship with the Information School and joined the metaLAB@Harvard, the Berkman-Klein Center’s “idea foundry and knowledge design lab,” as a Senior Researcher. After publishing 14 open-access research reports over nearly two decades, PIL ended all research operations in 2025 and archived its materials on the website.

== Work ==
PIL's studies were conducted using small teams of researchers drawn from libraries and schools of library and information science across the United States. The institutional sample for PIL studies consists of 93 public and private colleges, universities, and community colleges, as well as 34 high schools located in the U.S. A 2016 study included data from Canadian institutions. All together, more than 22,500 participants, mostly students, were interviewed or surveyed for PIL reports.

PIL established a Volunteer Sample of 260 institutions. Over 100 schools have partnered with PIL for their studies including Harvard College, The Ohio State University, University of Texas at Austin, University of Michigan, The University of Washington, Arizona State University, Brandeis University, Santa Clara University, University of Alaska, Wellesley College and numerous community colleges. Each PIL study underwent ethical reviews at the participating institutions and at the host institution where the study was based before data collection began.

Studies used a mixed-methods approach from the social science and information literacy fields, including large-scale surveys, focus groups, content analysis, extensive interviews, and computational analysis of social media interactions. Final reports have included summaries of key findings, in-depth data, links to surveys and datasets, and recommendations. All reports produced by PIL are open access under the CC-BY-NC license; many include open access data sets. THE PIL Archive site describes their research in conference as being broken into three phases, as follows:

=== The Finding Information Studies, 2009 - 2011 ===
These studies examined students’ information seeking practices through the lens of their experiences—their needs, strategies, and workarounds—as they navigate complex networked spaces using rapidly changing technologies. The research broke new ground by establishing baseline information about students’ approaches to online and print information: how they found, evaluated, and used a variety of sources to complete coursework and solve information problems in their everyday lives.

- Head, A.J. & Eisenberg, M.B. (2011). Balancing act: How college students manage technology while in the library during crunch time. Project Information Literacy Research Report. Information School, University of Washington. Retrieved August 28, 2025 from https://projectinfolit.org/publications/technology-usage-study/
- Head, A.J. & Eisenberg, M.B. (2010). Truth be told: How college students evaluate and use information in the digital age. Project Information Literacy Progress Report. Information School, University of Washington. Retrieved August 28, 2025 from https://projectinfolit.org/publications/evaluating-information-study/
- Head, A.J. & Eisenberg, M.B. (2010). Assigning inquiry: How handouts for research assignments guide today's college students. Project Information Literacy Progress Report. Information School, University of Washington. Retrieved August 28, 2025 from https://projectinfolit.org/publications/research-handouts-study/
- Head, A.J. & Eisenberg, M.B. (2009). Lessons learned: How college students seek information in the digital age. Project Information Literacy First Year Report with Student Survey Findings. Information School, University of Washington. Retrieved August 28, 2025 from https://projectinfolit.org/publications/information-seeking-habits/
- Head, A.J. & Eisenberg, M.B. (2009). Finding context: What today's college students say about conducting research in the digital age. Project Information Literacy Progress Report. Information School, University of Washington. Retrieved August 28, 2025 from https://projectinfolit.org/publications/finding-context-study/

=== The Passage Studies, 2012 - 2016 ===
These studies investigated how early adults navigate major information transitions in their lives as they move from high school to college, from college to the workplace, and from being college students to lifelong learners. The research explores how students experience profound changes in life at the intersection of evolving technologies, pedagogies, and expectations within the contexts of academic libraries, workspaces, and everyday life.

- Head, A.J. (2016). Planning and designing academic library learning spaces: Expert perspectives of architects, librarians, and library consultants. Project Information Literacy, Practitioner Series Research Report. Retrieved August 28, 2025 from https://projectinfolit.org/publications/library-space-study/
- Head, A.J. (2016). Staying smart: How today's graduates continue to learn once they complete college. Project Information Literacy, Passage Studies Research Report. Retrieved August 28, 2025 from https://projectinfolit.org/publications/lifelong-learning-study/
- Head, A.J. (2013). Learning the ropes: How freshmen conduct course research once they enter college. Project Information Literacy, Passage Studies Research Report. August 28, 2025 from https://projectinfolit.org/publications/first-year-experience-study/
- Head, A.J. (2012). Learning curve: How college graduates solve information problems once they join the workplace. Project Information Literacy, Passage Studies Research Report. August 28, 2025 from https://projectinfolit.org/publications/workplace-study/

=== The Zeitgeist Studies, 2018 - 2024 ===
These studies widened the scope of information literacy research by exploring key questions of our time, especially for early adults: how they engage with news they trust in light of “fake news,” how algorithms shape their beliefs about the world around them, and how their information worlds inform their understanding of Covid-19 and climate change. Ultimately, this research investigated how students can develop information agency when confronting complex, polarizing issues with lasting implications.

- Head, A.J., Geofrey, S., Fister, B., & Hostetler, K.(2024). How information worlds shape our response to climate change. Project Information Literacy Research Institute. August 28, 2025, from https://projectinfolit.org/publications/climate-study/
- Head, A.J., Fister, B., Geofrey, S., and MacMillan, M. (2022). The Project Information Literacy Retrospective: Insights from more than a decade of information literacy research, 2008-2022. Project Information Research Institute. Retrieved August 28, 2025, from https://projectinfolit.org/publications/retrospective
- Head, A.J., Braun, S., MacMillan, M., Yurkofsky, J. & Bull, A.C. (2020).Covid-19: The first 100 days of U.S. news coverage: Lessons about the media ecosystem for librarians, educators, students, and journalists. Project Information Literacy Research Institute. Retrieved August 28, 2025, from https://projectinfolit.org/publications/covid-19-the-first-100-days/
- Head, A.J., Fister, B. & MacMillan, M. (2020). Information Literacy in the Age of Algorithms: Student Experiences with News and Information, and the Need for Change, Project Information Literacy Research Institute. RetrievedAugust 28, 2025 from https://projectinfolit.org/publications/algorithm-study/
- Head, A.J., Wihbey, J., Metaxas, P. Takis, MacMillan, M., & Cohen, D. (2018). How Students Engage with News: Five Takeaways for Educators, Journalists, and Librarians," Project Information Literacy Research Institute. August 28, 2025 from https://projectinfolit.org/publications/news-study/

PIL's research results were disseminated through reports posted on its open access website, numerous articles, conference keynotes and presentations, webcasts, podcasts, and videos on its YouTube channel. PIL has been recognized as an important source of longitudinal information on the information behaviors of students. As Barbara Fister noted in her column, "[t]his is hands-down the most important long-term, multi-institutional research project ever launched on how students use information for school and beyond." PIL reports continue to be frequently cited in scholarly articles, linked from academic library webpages about information literacy, used in workshops for faculty, and students. The studies provide information about students' and graduates' information seeking strategies through the lens of the student experience across multiple institutional sites in the U.S. and have been reported on in The Chronicle of Higher Education, Inside Higher Education, Education Week, Library Journal, the Harvard Crimson, and the Poynter Institute,

=== Provocation Series: Essays, 2021–2022 ===
In 2021 PIL launched the Provocation Series of occasional papers on pressing issues around information literacy, building on PIL’s original research into students’ information practices in the digital age. Each essay is accompanied by an author's reflection and discussion questions.

- Fister, B. (2022). Principled uncertainty: Why learning to ask good questions matters more than finding answers.PIL Provocation Series, 2(1), Project Information Literacy Research Institute. Retrieved August 28, 2025 from https://projectinfolit.org/docs/provocation-series/essays/principled-uncertainty.html
- Caulfield, M. (2021). Information literacy for mortals. PIL Provocation Series, 1(5), Project Information Literacy Research Institute. Retrieved August 28, 2025 from https://projectinfolit.org/docs/provocation-series/essays/information-literacy-for-mortals.html
- Cooke, N.A. (2021). Tell me sweet little lies: Racism as a form of persistent malinformation. PIL Provocation Series, 1(4), Project Information Literacy Research Institute. Retrieved August 28, 2025 from https://projectinfolit.org/docs/provocation-series/essays/tell-me-sweet-little-lies.html
- Hostetler, K. (2021). The iSchool equation. PIL Provocation Series, 1(3), Project Information Literacy Research Institute. Retrieved August 28, 2025 from https://projectinfolit.org/docs/provocation-series/essays/the-ischool-equation.html
- Head, Alison J. (2021). Reading in the age of distrust. PIL Provocation Series, 1(2), Project Information Literacy Research Institute. Retrieved August 28, 2025 from https://projectinfolit.org/docs/provocation-series/essays/reading-in-the-age-of-distrust.html
- Fister, B. (2021). Lizard people in the library. PIL Provocation Series, 1(1), Project Information Literacy Research Institute. Retrieved August 28, 2025 from https://projectinfolit.org/docs/provocation-series/essays/lizard-people-in-the-library.html. This essay was republished in a slightly different form by The Atlantic, as "The Librarian War Against QAnon".

=== Smart Talk Interview Series, 2010–2024 ===
PIL created a series of Smart Talk interviews with leading voices related to its core purpose of understanding how early adults use information and technology to learn. Interviewees included: Ken Bain, Char Booth, Nicholas Carr, Mike Caulfield, Jenae Cohn, David Conley, Cathy Davidson, Katie Davis, Dale Dougherty, Sari Feldman, Barbara Fister, Eric Gordon, Renee Hobbs, Rebecca Moore Howard, Sandra Jamieson, Kyle Jones, Joan Lippincott, Robert Lue, Andrea Lunsford, Shannon Mattern, P. Takis Metaxas, Ryan M. Milner, Peter Morville, John Palfrey, Whitney Philliips, Russell Poldrack, Lee Rainie, Justin Reich Howard Rheingold, Dan Rothstein, Jeffrey Schnapp, Howie Schneider, Zach Sims, Peter Suber, Shyam Sundar, Benjamin Toff, Francesca Tripodi, S. Craig Watkins, David Weinberger, and Mary-Ann Winkelmes. The interviews have been compiled into a single document, Project Information Literacyʼs Smart Talks, 2010-2024, available on the archive site.

Throughout the years, PIL promoted research educational opportunities, such as hosting an annual fellowship for emerging researchers in information literacy. In 2025, PIL welcomed three mid-career professionals to the competitive PIL Research Scholars Program: Rachel Fundator from Purdue University, Heather Ganshorn at the University of Calgary and Stephanie Founds at The Ohio State University.

Another PIL project, The Reading List for Life, leveraged PIL's research findings to develop a web application for adult learners in public libraries, and was a collaboration between PIL, The Open Syllabus Project at Columbia University, and the metaLAB@Harvard.

== Recognition ==
PIL’s 2020 report, Information Literacy in the Age of Algorithms was awarded the Ilene F. Rockman Instruction Publication of the Year from the Association of College and Research Libraries (ACRL). Two articles by PIL researchers were recognized in the American Library Association Library Instruction Round Table Top 20 instruction articles: “Asking the Right Questions” in 2019 and “Dismantling the Evaluation Framework” in 2021.

Dr. Head, PIL’s founder, held year-long visiting scholar appointments at University of Nebraska - Lincoln (2016/2017), Purdue University (2017/2018), the University of Pittsburgh University Library System (2018/2019), and Gutman Library at Harvard Graduate School of Education (2019/2020), and further, Dr. Head was faculty at the Allbright Institute for Global Affairs at Wellesley College in 2019. In October 2024, Western Sydney University Library and the Institute for Culture and Society in Australia hosted Dr. Head, who was awarded a Fulbright from World Learning to give keynotes and to build cross-cultural communication in a three-week “PIL InfoLit Tour” in Sydney, Brisbane, Melbourne, and Canberra.

== Funding ==
PIL has received funding from major granting organizations, individuals, companies and institutions

- The Institute of Museum and Library Services (IMLS)
- John S. and James L. Knight Foundation
- John D. and Catherine T. MacArthur Foundation (General Division)
- Alfred P. Sloan Foundation
- Harvard Graduate School of Education
- Berkman Klein Center for Internet & Society, Harvard University 2011
- Electronic Research and Libraries (ER&L)
- Fulbright World Learning
- Marcie Rothman
- Eric and Simone Lang Foundation
- School of Library and Information Science at the University of South Carolina
- Association of College and Research Libraries
- University of Washington Information School
- Cable in the Classroom
- Cengage Learning
- ProQuest

== Other Works ==
=== Peer-reviewed articles ===
- Bull, A.C., MacMillan, M., & Head, A.J. (Jul. 21, 2021). Dismantling the evaluation framework, In the Library with the Lead Pipe. Retrieved August 28, 2025 from https://www.inthelibrarywiththeleadpipe.org/2021/dismantling-evaluation/
- Head, A.J., Bull, A.C., & MacMillan, M. (Oct. 2019). Asking the right questions: Bridging gaps between information literacy assessment approaches, Against the Grain, 31(4). Retrieved August 28, 2025 from https://docs.lib.purdue.edu/cgi/viewcontent.cgi?article=8408&context=atg
- Head, A.J., DeFrain, E., Fister, B. & MacMillan, M. (Aug. 2019). Across the great divide: How today's college students engage with news, First Monday, 24(8). Retrieved August 28, 2025 from https://firstmonday.org/ojs/index.php/fm/article/view/10166/8057 doi: https://doi.org/10.5210/fm.v24i8.10166
- Head, A.J., Van Hoeck, M., & Hostetler, K. (Oct. 2017). Why blogs endure: A study of recent college graduates and motivations for blog readership. First Monday, 22(10). Retrieved August 28, 2025 from http://firstmonday.org/ojs/index.php/fm/article/view/8065/6539
- Head, A.J. (2017). Posing the million-dollar question: What happens after graduation? Journal of Information Literacy, 11(1), 80–90. Retrieved August 28, 2025 from https://journals.cilip.org.uk/jil/article/view/336
- Head, A.J., Van Hoeck, M., & Garson, D.S. (Feb. 2015). Lifelong learning in the digital age: A content analysis of recent research on participation.First Monday, 20(2). Retrieved August 28, 2025 from http://firstmonday.org/ojs/index.php/fm/article/view/5857/4210
- Head, A.J., Van Hoeck, M., Eschler, J., & Fullerton, S. (2013). What information competencies matter in today's workplace? Library and Information Research, 37(114), 75–104. Retrieved August 28, 2025 from https://www.lirgjournal.org.uk/index.php/lir/article/view/557
- Head, A.J. & Eisenberg, M. B. (Apr. 2011). How college students use the web to conduct everyday life research. First Monday, 16(4). Retrieved August 28, 2025 from https://firstmonday.org/ojs/index.php/fm/article/view/3484
- Head, A.J. & Eisenberg, M. B. (Mar. 2010). How today's college students use Wikipedia for course-related research. First Monday, 15(3). Retrieved August 28, 2025 from http://firstmonday.org/ojs/index.php/fm/article/view/2830
- Head, A.J. (2008). Information literacy from the trenches: How do humanities and social science majors conduct academic research? College and Research Libraries, 69(5), 427–446. Retrieved August 28, 2025 from http://crl.acrl.org/index.php/crl/article/view/15957
- Head, A.J. (Jul. 2007). Beyond Google: How do students conduct academic research? First Monday, 12(7). Retrieved August 28, 2025 from http://firstmonday.org/ojs/index.php/fm/article/view/1998

=== Proceedings ===
- Head, A.J. (2013). Project Information Literacy: What can be learned about the information-seeking behavior of today's college students? Association of College and Research Libraries (ACRL) Annual Conference Proceedings. Chicago: American Library Association. Retrieved August 28, 2025 from http://www.ala.org/acrl/sites/ala.org.acrl/files/content/conferences/confsandpreconfs/2013/papers/Head_Project.pdf

=== Opinion and editorials ===
- Head, A. J. (Sep. 11, 2025). After 17 years, Project Information Literacy to end: One final contribution will launch this month. College and Research Libraries News, 86 (8). Retrieved September 11, 2025 from https://crln.acrl.org/index.php/crlnews/article/view/26954
- Fister, B. & Head, A.J. (May 4, 2023). Getting a grip on ChatGPT. Inside Higher Ed. Retrieved August 28, 2025 from https://www.insidehighered.com/opinion/views/2023/05/04/getting-grip-chatgpt
- Head, A.J., Fister, B., & MacMillan, M. (Mar. 15, 2019). News digests to the rescue? Storybench. Retrieved August 28, 2025 from http://www.storybench.org/news-digests-to-the-rescue/
- Head, A.J. & Wihbey, J. (Apr. 8, 2017). The importance of truth workers in an era of factual recession. Medium. Retrieved August 28, 2025 from https://medium.com/@ajhead1/the-importance-of-truth-workers-in-an-era-of-factual-recession-7487fda8eb3b
- Head, A.J. & Wihbey, J. (Jul. 10, 2014). At sea in a deluge of data. The Chronicle of Higher Education. Retrieved August 28, 2025 from http://chronicle.com/article/At-Sea-in-a-Deluge-of-Data/147477/
- Head, A.J. (Dec. 8, 2012). Old-school job skills you won't find on Google. The Seattle Times. Retrieved August 28, 2025 from https://www.seattletimes.com/opinion/op-ed-old-school-job-skills-you-wonrsquot-find-on-google/
- Head, A.J. & Eisenberg, M.B. (Jun. 3, 2011). College students eager to learn but need help negotiating information overload. The Seattle Times. Retrieved August 28, 2025 from https://www.seattletimes.com/opinion/college-students-eager-to-learn-but-need-help-negotiating-information-overload
- Eisenberg, M.B. & Head, A.J. (May 2, 2009). Add 'research' to education's traditional three Rs. The Seattle Times. Retrieved August 28, 2025 from https://www.seattletimes.com/opinion/guest-columnists-add-research-to-educations-traditional-three-rs/

== See also ==
- Higher education
- Information literacy
- Library instruction
- Media literacy
