= Information architecture =

Structural design of shared information

Information architecture is the structural design of shared information environments, in particular the organisation of websites and software to support usability and findability.

The term information architecture was coined by Richard Saul Wurman. Since its inception, information architecture has become an emerging community of practice focused on applying principles of design, architecture and information science in digital spaces.

Typically, a model or concept of information is used and applied to activities which require explicit details of complex information systems. These activities include library systems and database development.

== Definition ==
The term information architecture has different meanings in different branches of information systems or information technology.

=== User experience ===
In user experience design, information architecture has been described as the structural design of shared information environments, comprising the study and practice of organising and labelling web sites, intranets, online communities, and software to support user experience, in particular, the findability and usability of information. It has also been described as an emerging community of practice focused on bringing principles of design and architecture to the digital landscape.

=== Information systems ===
Technically speaking, information architecture comprises the combination of organization, labeling, search and navigation systems within websites and intranets, serving as a navigational aid to the content of information-rich systems.

=== Data architecture ===
Information architecture can be described as a subset of data architecture where usable data is constructed, designed, and arranged in a fashion most useful to the users of data.

=== Systems design ===
In the field of systems design, for example, information architecture is a component of enterprise architecture that deals with the information component when describing the structure of an enterprise. Some system design practitioners regard information architecture as strictly the application of information science to web design, which considers such issues as classification and information retrieval, and not factors like user experience and information design.

== Principles ==
Principles of information architecture include the following:

- The principle of objects
- The principle of choices
- The principle of disclosure
- The principle of exemplars
- The principle of front doors
- The principle of multiple classification
- The principle of focused navigation
- The principle of growth

== History ==
Richard Saul Wurman is credited with coining the term information architecture in relation to the design of information.

From 1998 to 2015, Peter Morville and Louis Rosenfeld were co-authors of Information Architecture for the World Wide Web.

Other authors include Jesse James Garrett and Christina Wodtke.

== See also ==
- Applications architecture – Type of architecture domain within enterprise architecture
- Card sorting – Knowledge elicitation research method
- Chief experience officer – Corporate officer responsible for overall user experience
- Content management – Creation and presentation of information for an audience
- Content strategy
- Controlled vocabulary – Method of organizing knowledge
- Data management – Disciplines of managing data as a resource
- Data presentation architecture – Visual representation of data
- Digital humanities – Area of scholarly activity
- Ecological interface design – Approach to interface design
- Enterprise information security architecture
- Faceted classification – Method of systematically organizing knowledge
- File format – Structure of information stored on a computer
- Human factors and ergonomics
- Informatics – Field of study of computational systems
- Interaction design – Specialization of design focused on the experience users have of a product or service
- Process architecture – Structural design of general process systems
- Site map – List of pages of a web site
- Social information architecture
- Tree testing – Method of evaluating topic trees for findability
- User experience design – Field of design focusing on the creation of user-centered products and websites
- Knowledge visualization – Set of techniques for creating images, diagrams, or animations to communicate a message
- Wayfinding – Ways in which people navigate from place to place
- Web graph – Graph of connected web pages
- Web literacy – Ability to read and write web content

== Bibliography ==
- Wurman, Richard Saul (1997). Information Architects (1st ed.). Graphis Inc. ISBN 1-888-00138-0.
- Morville, Peter; Rosenfeld, Louis (2007). Information architecture for the World Wide Web (3rd ed.). Sebastopol, CA: O'Reilly & Associates. ISBN 978-0-596-52734-1. "information architecture."
- Wodtke, Christina (2009). Information Architecture - Blueprints for the Web (2nd ed.). New Riders. ISBN 978-0-321-60080-6.
- Resmini, Andrea; Rosati, Luca (2011). Pervasive Information Architecture - Designing Cross-channel User Experiences (1st ed.). Morgan Kaufmann. ISBN 978-0-123-82094-5.
- Van Dijck, Peter (August 1, 2003). Information Architecture for Designers: Structuring Websites for Business Success. Rotovision. ISBN 9782880467319.
