= Information literacy =

Academic discipline

The Association of College and Research Libraries defines information literacy as a "set of integrated abilities encompassing the reflective discovery of information, the understanding of how information is produced and valued and the use of information in creating new knowledge and participating ethically in communities of learning". In the United Kingdom( UK) , the Chartered Institute of Library and Information Professionals' definition also makes reference to knowing both "when" and "why" information is needed.

The 1989 American Library Association (ALA) Presidential Committee on Information Literacy formally defined information literacy (IL) as attributes of an individual, stating that "to be information literate, a person must be able to recognize when information is needed and have the ability to locate, evaluate and use effectively the needed information". In 1990, academic Lori Arp published a paper asking, "Are information literacy instruction and bibliographic instruction the same?" Arp argued that neither term was particularly well defined by theoreticians or practitioners in the field. Further studies were needed to lessen the confusion and continue to articulate the parameters of the question.

The Alexandria Proclamation of 2005 defined the term as a human rights issue: "Information literacy empowers people in all walks of life to seek, evaluate, use and create information effectively to achieve their personal, social, occupational and educational goals. It is a basic human right in a digital world and promotes social inclusion in all nations." The United States National Forum on Information Literacy defined information literacy as "the ability to know when there is a need for information, to be able to identify, locate, evaluate, and effectively use that information for the issue or problem at hand." Meanwhile, in the UK, the library professional body CILIP, define information literacy as "the ability to think critically and make balanced judgements about any information we find and use. It empowers us as citizens to develop informed views and to engage fully with society."

A number of other efforts have been made to better define the concept and its relationship to other skills and forms of literacy. Other pedagogical outcomes related to information literacy include traditional literacy, computer literacy, research skills and critical thinking skills. Information literacy as a sub-discipline is an emerging topic of interest and counter measure among educators and librarians with the prevalence of misinformation, fake news, and disinformation.

Scholars have argued that in order to maximize people's contributions to a democratic and pluralistic society, educators should be challenging governments and the business sector to support and fund educational initiatives in information literacy.

== History ==
The phrase "information literacy" first appeared in print in a 1974 report written on behalf of the National Commission on Libraries and Information Science by Paul G. Zurkowski, who was at the time president of the Information Industry Association (now the Software and Information Industry Association). Zurkowski used the phrase to describe the "techniques and skills" learned by the information literate "for utilizing the wide range of information tools as well as primary sources in molding information solutions to their problems" and drew a relatively firm line between the "literates" and "information illiterates."

The concept of information literacy appeared again in a 1976 paper by Lee Burchina presented at the Texas A&M University library's symposium. Burchina identified a set of skills needed to locate and use information for problem solving and decision making. In another 1976 article in Library Journal, M.R. Owens applied the concept to political information literacy and civic responsibility, stating, "All [people] are created equal but voters with information resources are in a position to make more intelligent decisions than citizens who are information illiterates. The application of information resources to the process of decision-making to fulfill civic responsibilities is a vital necessity."

In a literature review published in an academic journal in 2020, Oral Roberts University professor Angela Sample cites several conceptual waves of information literacy definitions as defining information as a way of thinking, a set of skills, and a social practice. The introduction of these concepts led to the adoption of a mechanism called metaliteracy and the creation of threshold concepts and knowledge dispositions, which led to the creation of the ALA's Information Literacy Framework.

The American Library Association's Presidential Committee on Information Literacy released a report on January 10, 1989. Titled as the Presidential Committee on Information Literacy: Final Report, the article outlines the importance of information literacy, opportunities to develop it, and the idea of an Information Age School. The recommendations of the Committee led to establishment of the National Forum on Information Literacy, a coalition of more than 90 national and international organizations.

In 1998, the American Association of School Librarians and the Association for Educational Communications and Technology published Information Power: Building Partnerships for Learning, which further established specific goals for information literacy education, defining some nine standards in the categories of "information literacy," "independent learning," and "social responsibility."

Also in 1998, the Presidential Committee on Information Literacy updated its final report. The report outlined six recommendations from the original report, and examined areas of challenge and progress.

In 1999, the Society of College, National and University Libraries (SCONUL) in the UK published The Seven Pillars of Information Literacy to model the relationship between information skills and IT skills, and the idea of the progression of information literacy into the curriculum of higher education.

In 2003, the National Forum on Information Literacy, along with UNESCO and the National Commission on Libraries and Information Science, sponsored an international conference in Prague. Representatives from twenty-three countries gathered to discuss the importance of information literacy in a global context. The resulting Prague Declaration described information literacy as a "key to social, cultural, and economic development of nations and communities, institutions and individuals in the 21st century" and declared its acquisition as "part of the basic human right of lifelong learning".

In the United States specifically, information literacy was prioritized in 2009 during President Barack Obama's first term. In effort to stress the value information literacy has on everyday communication, he designated October as National Information Literacy Awareness Month in his released proclamation.

In 2015, the Association of College and Research Libraries (ACRL) adopted the Framework for Information Literacy for Higher Education, which defines information literacy as "the set of integrated abilities encompassing the reflective discovery of information, the understanding of how information is produced and valued, and the use of information in creating new knowledge and participating ethically in communities of learning".Association of College and Research Libraries (2015-02-09). "Framework for Information Literacy for Higher Education". Association of College and Research Libraries. American Library Association.

== Presidential Committee on Information Literacy ==
The American Library Association's Presidential Committee on Information Literacy defined information literacy as the ability "to recognize when information is needed and have the ability to locate, evaluate, and use effectively the needed information" and highlighted information literacy as a skill essential for lifelong learning and the production of an informed and prosperous citizenry.

The committee outlined six principal recommendations. Included were recommendations like "Reconsider the ways we have organized information institutionally, structured information access, and defined information's role in our lives at home in the community, and in the work place"; to promote "public awareness of the problems created by information illiteracy"; to develop a national research agenda related to information and its use; to ensure the existence of "a climate conducive to students' becoming information literate"; to include information literacy concerns in teacher education democracy.

In the updated report, the committee ended with an invitation, asking the National Forum and regular citizens to recognize that "the result of these combined efforts will be a citizenry which is made up of effective lifelong learners who can always find the information needed for the issue or decision at hand. This new generation of information literate citizens will truly be America's most valuable resource," and to continue working toward an information literate world.

The Presidential Committee on Information Literacy resulted in the creation of the National Forum on Information Literacy.

== National Forum on Information Literacy ==
In 1983, United States published "A Nation at Risk: The Imperative for Educational Reform", a report declaring that a "rising tide of mediocrity" was eroding the foundation of the American educational system. The report has been regarded as the genesis of the current educational reform movement within the United States.

This report, in conjunction with the rapid emergence of the information society, led the American Library Association (ALA) to convene a panel of educators and librarians in 1987. The Forum, UNESCO and International Federation of Library Associations and Institutions (IFLA) collaborated to organize several "experts meetings" that resulted in the Prague Declaration (2003) and the Alexandria Proclamation (2005). Both statements underscore the importance of information literacy as a basic, fundamental human right, and consider IL as a lifelong learning skill.

== Global ==
=== International Federation of Library Associations and Institutions (IFLA) ===
IFLA has established an Information Literacy Section. The Section has, in turn, developed and mounted an Information Literacy Resources Directory, called InfoLit Global. Librarians, educators and information professionals may self-register and upload information-literacy-related materials. (IFLA, Information Literacy Section, n.d.) According to the IFLA website, "The primary purpose of the Information Literacy Section is to foster international cooperation in the development of information literacy education in all types of libraries and information institutions."

=== The International Alliance for Information Literacy (IAIL) ===
This alliance was created from the recommendation of the Prague Conference of Information Literacy Experts in 2003. One of its goals is to allow for the sharing of information literacy research and knowledge between nations. The IAIL also sees "lifelong learning" as a basic human right, and their ultimate goal is to use information literacy as a way to allow everyone to participate in the "Information Society" as a way of fulfilling this right. The following organizations are founding members of IAIL:

- Australian and New Zealand Institute for Information Literacy (ANZIIL), based in Australia and New Zealand
- European Network on Information Literacy (EnIL), based in the European Union
- National Forum on Information Literacy (NFIL), based in the United States
- NORDINFOlit, based in Scandinavia
- SCONUL (Society of College, National and University Libraries) Advisory Committee on Information Literacy, based in the United Kingdom

=== UNESCO Media and Information Literacy (MIL) ===
UNESCO's MIL aims to promote critical thinking and enhance an individual's ability to access, evaluate, use and create media in various forms.

According to the UNESCO website, their "action to provide people with the skills and abilities for critical reception, assessment and use of information and media in their professional and personal lives." Their goal is to create information literate societies by creating and maintaining educational policies for information literacy. They work with teachers around the world, training them in the importance of information literacy and providing resources for them to use in their classrooms.

UNESCO publishes studies in multiple countries, looking at how information literacy is currently taught, how it differs in different demographics, and how to raise awareness. They also publish tools and curricula for school boards and teachers to implement.

UNESCO has promoted media and information literacy as an international educational priority, developing global guidelines intended to support media and information literacy curricula in countries around the world while encouraging adaptation to local contexts.

== Specific aspects ==
In "Information Literacy as a Liberal Art," Jeremy J. Shapiro and Shelley K. Hughes (1996) advocated a more holistic approach to information literacy education, one that encouraged not merely the addition of information technology courses as an adjunct to existing curricula, but rather a radically new conceptualization of "our entire educational curriculum in terms of information."

Drawing upon Enlightenment ideals like those articulated by Enlightenment philosopher Condorcet, Shapiro and Hughes argued that information literacy education is "essential to the future of democracy, if citizens are to be intelligent shapers of the information society rather than its pawns, and to humanistic culture, if information is to be part of a meaningful existence rather than a routine of production and consumption."

To this end, Shapiro and Hughes outlined a "prototype curriculum" that encompassed the concepts of computer literacy, library skills, and "a broader, critical conception of a more humanistic sort," suggesting seven important components of a holistic approach to information literacy:

- Tool literacy, or the ability to understand and use the practical and conceptual tools of current information technology relevant to education and the areas of work and professional life that the individual expects to inhabit.
- Resource literacy, or the ability to understand the form, format, location and access methods of information resources, especially daily expanding networked information resources.
- Social-structural literacy, or understanding how information is socially situated and produced.
- Research literacy, or the ability to understand and use the IT-based tools relevant to the work of today's researcher and scholar.
- Publishing literacy, or the ability to format and publish research and ideas electronically, in textual and multimedia forms ... to introduce them into the electronic public realm and the electronic community of scholars.
- Emerging technology literacy, or the ability to continuously adapt to, understand, evaluate and make use of the continually emerging innovations in information technology so as not to be a prisoner of prior tools and resources, and to make intelligent decisions about the adoption of new ones.
- Critical literacy, or the ability to evaluate critically the intellectual, human and social strengths and weaknesses, potentials and limits, benefits and costs of information technologies.

Ira Shor further defines critical literacy as "habits of thought, reading, writing, and speaking which go beneath surface meaning, first impressions, dominant myths, official pronouncements, traditional clichés, received wisdom, and mere opinions, to understand the deep meaning, root causes, social context, ideology, and personal consequences of any action, event, object, process, organization, experience, text, subject matter, policy, mass media, or discourse."

== Information literacy skills ==
=== Big6 skills ===
Big6 (Eisenberg and Berkowitz 1990) is a six-step process that provides support in the activities required to solve information-based problems: task definition, information seeking strategies, location and access, use of information, synthesis, and evaluation. The Big6 skills have been used in a variety of settings to help those with a variety of needs. For example, the library of Dubai Women's College, in Dubai, United Arab Emirates which is an English as a second language institution, uses the Big6 model for its information literacy workshops. According to Story-Huffman (2009), using Big6 at the college "has transcended cultural and physical boundaries to provide a knowledge base to help students become information literate" (para. 8). In primary grades, Big6 has been found to work well with variety of cognitive and language levels found in the classroom.

Differentiated instruction and the Big6 appear to be made for each other. While it seems as though all children will be on the same Big6 step at the same time during a unit of instruction, there is no reason students cannot work through steps at an individual pace. In addition, the Big 6 process allows for seamless differentiation by interest.

Issues to consider in the Big6 approach have been highlighted by Philip Doty:

This approach is problem-based, is designed to fit into the context of Benjamin Bloom's taxonomy of cognitive objectives, and aims toward the development of critical thinking. While the Big6 approach has a great deal of power, it also has serious weaknesses. Chief among these are the fact that users often lack well-formed statements of information needs, as well as the model's reliance on problem-solving rhetoric. Often, the need for information and its use are situated in circumstances that are not as well-defined, discrete, and monolithic as problems.

Eisenberg (2004) has recognized that there are a number of challenges to effectively applying the Big6 skills, not the least of which is information overload which can overwhelm students. Part of Eisenberg's solution is for schools to help students become discriminating users of information.

=== Another conception ===
This conception, used primarily in the library and information studies field, and rooted in the concepts of library instruction and bibliographic instruction, is the ability "to recognize when information is needed and have the ability to locate, evaluate and use effectively the needed information." In this view, information literacy is the basis for lifelong learning. It is also the basis for evaluating contemporary sources of information.

In the publication Information Power: Building Partnerships for Learning (AASL and AECT, 1998), three categories, nine standards, and twenty-nine indicators are used to describe the information literate student.

The categories and their standards are as follows:

==== Category 1: Information literacy ====
Standards: The student who is information literate

1. accesses information efficiently and effectively.
2. evaluates information critically and competently.
3. uses information accurately and creatively.

==== Category 2: Independent learning ====
Standards: The student who is an independent learner is information literate and

1. pursues information related to personal interests.
2. appreciates literature and other creative expressions of information.
3. strives for excellence in information seeking and knowledge generation.

==== Category 3: Social responsibility ====
Standards: The student who contributes positively to the learning community and to society is information literate and

1. recognizes the importance of information to a democratic society.
2. practices ethical behavior in regard to information and information technology.
3. participates effectively in groups to pursue and generate information.

Since information may be presented in a number of formats, the term "information" applies to more than just the printed word. Other literacies such as visual, media, computer, network, and basic literacies are implicit in information literacy.

Many of those who are in most need of information literacy are often amongst those least able to access the information they require:

Minority and at-risk students, illiterate adults, people with English as a second language, and economically disadvantaged people are among those most likely to lack access to the information that can improve their situations. Most are not even aware of the potential help that is available to them.

As the Presidential Committee report points out, members of these disadvantaged groups are often unaware that libraries can provide them with the access, training and information they need. In Osborne (2004), many libraries around the country are finding numerous ways to reach many of these disadvantaged groups by discovering their needs in their own environments (including prisons) and offering them specific services in the libraries themselves.

== Effects on education ==
The rapidly evolving information landscape has created a need for educational methods and practices to evolve and adapt accordingly. Information literacy is a key focus of educational institutions at all levels, and in order to uphold this standard, institutions are promoting a commitment to lifelong learning and an ability to seek out and identify the innovations that will be needed to keep pace with, or even outpace change.

Educational methods and practices, within our increasingly information-centric society, can help students develop skills to evaluate and use information effectively. An important component of information literacy is the ability to evaluate information, to ascertain among other things its relevance, authenticity and modernity. Information evaluation is widely recognized as a component of information literacy and a basis for lifelong learning. According to Lankshear and Knobel, they believe the education system is a new understanding of literacy, information literacy and on literacy teaching. They advocate for educators to learn to account for the context of our culturally and linguistically diverse and increasingly globalized societies.This perspective also considers the growing variety of text forms associated with information and multimedia technologies.

Evaluation consists of several component processes including metacognition, goals, personal disposition, cognitive development, deliberation, and decision-making. This is both a difficult and complex challenge and underscores the importance of being able to think critically.

Critical thinking is an important educational outcome for students. Education institutions have experimented with several strategies to help foster critical thinking, as a means to enhance information evaluation and information literacy among students. When evaluating evidence, students should be encouraged to practice formal argumentation. Debates and formal presentations must also be encouraged to analyze and critically evaluate information.

Education professionals must underscore the importance of high information quality. Students must be trained to distinguish between fact and opinion. They must be encouraged to use cue words such as "I think" and "I feel" to help distinguish between factual information and opinions. Information related skills that are complex or difficult to comprehend must be broken down into smaller parts. Another approach would be to train students in familiar contexts. Education professionals should encourage students to examine "causes" of behaviors, actions and events. Research shows that people evaluate more effectively if causes are revealed, where available.

Information in any format is produced to convey a message and is shared via a selected delivery method. The iterative processes of researching, creating, revising, and disseminating information vary, and the resulting product reflects these differences (Association of College, p. 5).

Some call for increased critical analysis in Information Literacy instruction. Smith (2013) identifies this as beneficial "to individuals, particularly young people during their period of formal education. It could equip them with the skills they need to understand the political system and their place within it, and, where necessary, to challenge this" (p. 16).

== Education in the U.S. ==
=== Standards ===
National content standards, state standards and information literacy skills terminology may vary, but all have common components relating to information literacy.

Information literacy skills are critical to several of the National Education Goals outlined in the Goals 2000: Educate America Act, particularly in the act's aims to increase "school readiness," "student achievement and citizenship," and "adult literacy and lifelong learning." Of specific relevance are the "focus on lifelong learning, the ability to think critically, and on the use of new and existing information for problem solving," all of which are important components of information literacy.

In 1998, the American Association of School Librarians and the Association for Educational Communications and Technology published "Information Literacy Standards for Student Learning," which identified nine standards that librarians and teachers in K–12 schools could use to describe information literate students and define the relationship of information literacy to independent learning and social responsibility:

- Standard One: The student who is information literate accesses information efficiently and effectively.
- Standard Two: The student who is information literate evaluates information critically and competently.
- Standard Three: The student who is information literate uses information accurately and creatively.
- Standard Four: The student who is an independent learner is information literate and pursues information related to personal interests.
- Standard Five: The student who is an independent learner is information literate and appreciates literature and other creative expressions of information.
- Standard Six: The student who is an independent learner is information literate and strives for excellence in information seeking and knowledge generation.
- Standard Seven: The student who contributes positively to the learning community and to society is information literate and recognizes the importance of information to a democratic society.
- Standard Eight: The student who contributes positively to the learning community and to society is information literate and practices ethical behavior in regard to information and information technology.
- Standard Nine: The student who contributes positively to the learning community and to society is information literate and participates effectively in groups to pursue and generate information.

In 2007 AASL expanded and restructured the standards that school librarians should strive for in their teaching. These were published as "Standards for the 21st Century Learner" and address several literacies: information, technology, visual, textual, and digital. These aspects of literacy were organized within four key goals: that "learners use of skills, resources, & tools" to "inquire, think critically, and gain knowledge"; to "draw conclusions, make informed decisions, apply knowledge to new situations, and create new knowledge"; to "share knowledge and participate ethically and productively as members of our democratic society"; and to "pursue personal and aesthetic growth."

In 2000, the Association of College and Research Libraries (ACRL), a division of the American Library Association (ALA), released "Information Literacy Competency Standards for Higher Education," describing five standards and numerous performance indicators considered best practices for the implementation and assessment of postsecondary information literacy programs. The five standards are:

- Standard One: The information literate student determines the nature and extent of the information needed.
- Standard Two: The information literate student accesses needed information effectively and efficiently.
- Standard Three: The information literate student evaluates information and its sources critically and incorporates selected information into his or her knowledge base and value system.
- Standard Four: The information literate student, individually or as a member of a group, uses information effectively to accomplish a specific purpose.
- Standard Five: The information literate student understands many of the economic, legal, and social issues surrounding the use of information and accesses and uses information ethically and legally.

These standards were meant to span from the simple to more complicated, or in terms of Bloom's Taxonomy of Educational Objectives, from the "lower order" to the "higher order." Lower order skills would involve for instance being able to use an online catalog to find a book relevant to an information need in an academic library. Higher order skills would involve critically evaluating and synthesizing information from multiple sources into a coherent interpretation or argument.

In 2016, the Association of College and Research Librarians (ACRL) rescinded the Standards and replaced them with the Framework for Information Literacy for Higher Education, which offers the following set of core ideas:

- Authority is constructed and contextual
- Information creation as a process
- Information has value
- Research as inquiry
- Scholarship as conversation
- Searching as strategic exploration

The Framework is based on a cluster of interconnected core concepts, with flexible options for implementation, rather than on a set of standards or learning outcomes, or any prescriptive enumeration of skills. At the heart of this Framework are conceptual understandings that organize many other concepts and ideas about information, research, and scholarship into a coherent whole.

=== K–12 education restructuring ===
Today instruction methods have changed drastically from the mostly one-directional teacher-student model, to a more collaborative approach where the students themselves feel empowered. Much of this challenge is now being informed by the American Association of School Librarians that published new standards for student learning in 2007.

Within the K–12 environment, effective curriculum development is vital to imparting Information Literacy skills to students. Given the already heavy load on students, efforts must be made to avoid curriculum overload. Eisenberg strongly recommends adopting a collaborative approach to curriculum development among classroom teachers, librarians, technology teachers, and other educators. Staff must be encouraged to work together to analyze student curriculum needs, develop a broad instruction plan, set information literacy goals, and design specific unit and lesson plans that integrate the information skills and classroom content. These educators can also collaborate on teaching and assessment duties

Educators are selecting various forms of resource-based learning (authentic learning, problem-based learning and work-based learning) to help students focus on the process and to help students learn from the content. Information literacy skills are necessary components of each. Within a school setting, it is very important that a students' specific needs as well as the situational context be kept in mind when selecting topics for integrated information literacy skills instruction. The primary goal should be to provide frequent opportunities for students to learn and practice information problem solving. To this extent, it is also vital to facilitate repetition of information seeking actions and behavior. The importance of repetition in information literacy lesson plans cannot be underscored, since we tend to learn through repetition. A students' proficiency will improve over time if they are afforded regular opportunities to learn and to apply the skills they have learnt.

The process approach to education is requiring new forms of student assessment. Students demonstrate their skills, assess their own learning, and evaluate the processes by which this learning has been achieved by preparing portfolios, learning and research logs, and using rubrics.

=== Efforts in K–12 education ===
Information literacy efforts are underway on individual, local, and regional bases.

Many states have either fully adopted AASL information literacy standards or have adapted them to suit their needs. States such as Oregon (OSLIS, 2009) increasing rely on these guidelines for curriculum development and setting information literacy goals. Virginia, on the other hand, chose to undertake a comprehensive review, involving all relevant stakeholders and formulate its own guidelines and standards for information literacy. At an international level, two framework documents jointly produced by UNESCO and the IFLA (International Federation of Library Associations and Institutions) developed two framework documents that laid the foundations in helping define the educational role to be played by school libraries: the School library manifesto (1999).

Another immensely popular approach to imparting information literacy is the Big6 set of skills. Eisenberg claims that the Big6 is the most widely used model in K–12 education. This set of skills seeks to articulate the entire information seeking life cycle. The Big6 is made up of six major stages and two sub-stages under each major stages. It defines the six steps as being: task definition, information seeking strategies, location and access, use of information, synthesis, and evaluation. Such approaches seek to cover the full range of information problem-solving actions that a person would normally undertake, when faced with an information problem or with making a decision based on available resources.

=== Efforts in higher education ===
Information literacy instruction in higher education can take a variety of forms: stand-alone courses or classes, online tutorials, workbooks, course-related instruction, or course-integrated instruction.

The six regional accreditation boards have added information literacy to their standards. Librarians often are required to teach the concepts of information literacy during "one shot" classroom lectures. There are also credit courses offered by academic librarians to instruct college students in becoming more information literate. Additionally, information literacy instruction is usually tailored to a specific disciplines. One such attempt in the area of physics was published in 2009 but there are many many more published.

In 2016, the Association of College and Research Libraries (ACRL, part of the American Library Association) adopted a new "Framework for Information Literacy for Higher Education," replacing the ACRL's "Information Literacy Standards for Higher Education" that had been approved in 2000. The standards were largely criticized by proponents of critical information literacy, a concept deriving from critical pedagogy, for being too prescriptive. It's termed a "framework" because it consists of interconnected core concepts designed to be interpreted and implemented locally depending on the context and needs of the audience. The framework draws on recent research around threshold concepts, or the ideas that are gateways to broader understanding or skills in a given discipline. It also draws on newer research around metaliteracy, and assumes a more holistic view of information literacy that includes creation and collaboration in addition to consumption, so is appropriate for current practices around social media and Web 2.0. The six concepts, or frames, are:

- Authority is constructed and contextual
- Information creation as a process
- Information has value
- Research as inquiry
- Scholarship as conversation
- Searching as strategic exploration

This draws from the concept of metaliteracy, which offers a renewed vision of information literacy as an overarching set of abilities in which students are consumers and creators of information who can participate successfully in collaborative spaces (Association of College, p. 2) There is a growing body of scholarly research describing faculty-librarian collaboration to bring information literacy skills practice into higher education curriculum, moving beyond "one shot" lectures to an integrated model in which librarians help design assignments, create guides to useful course resources, and provide direct support to students throughout courses. A recent literature review indicates that there is still a lack of evidence concerning the unique information literacy practices of doctoral students, especially within disciplines such as the health sciences.

There have also been efforts in higher education to highlight issues of data privacy, as they relate to information literacy. For example, at the University of North Florida, in 2021, data privacy was added to their Library and Information Studies curriculum. The history of data privacy was included in this change, as well as topics such as, "data collection, data brokers, browser fingerprinting, cookies, data security, IP ranges, SSO, http vs https, anonymization, encryption, opt out vs opt in. These are all areas in which information professionals can improve information literacy, through understanding data privacy, practicing good techniques for data privacy, and teaching patrons about the importance/techniques for data privacy. Additionally, information literacy instruction has been offered focusing on fake news.

=== Distance education ===
Now that information literacy has become a part of the core curriculum at many post-secondary institutions, the library community is charged to provide information literacy instruction in a variety of formats, including online learning and distance education. The Association of College and Research Libraries (ACRL) addresses this need in its Guidelines for Distance Education Services (2000):

Library resources and services in institutions of higher education must meet the needs of all their faculty, students, and academic support staff, wherever these individuals are located, whether on a main campus, off campus, in distance education or extended campus programs—or in the absence of a campus at all, in courses taken for credit or non-credit; in continuing education programs; in courses attended in person or by means of electronic transmission; or any other means of distance education.

Within the e-learning and distance education worlds, providing effective information literacy programs brings together the challenges of both distance librarianship and instruction. With the prevalence of course management systems such as WebCT and Blackboard, library staff are embedding information literacy training within academic programs and within individual classes themselves.

== Education in Singapore ==
=== Public education ===
In October 2013, the National Library of Singapore (NLB) created the S.U.R.E, (Source, Understand, Research, Evaluate) campaign. The objectives and strategies of the S.U.R.E. campaign were first presented at the 2014 IFLA WLIC. It is summarised by NLB as simplifying information literacy into four basic building blocks, to "promote and educate the importance of Information Literacy and discernment in information searching."

Public events furthering the S.U.R.E. campaign were organised 2015. This was called the "Super S.U.R.E. Show" involving speakers to engage the public with their anecdotes and other learning points, for example the ability to separate fact from opinion.

=== Higher Education ===
Information literacy is taught by librarians at institutes of higher education. Some components of information literacy are embedded in the undergraduate curriculum at the National University of Singapore.

== Assessment ==
Many academic libraries are participating in a culture of assessment, and attempt to show the value of their information literacy interventions to their students. Librarians use a variety of techniques for this assessment, some of which aim to empower students and librarians and resist adherence to unquestioned norms. Information literacy instruction has been shown to improve student outcomes in higher education. Oakleaf describes the benefits and dangers of various assessment approaches: fixed-choice tests, performance assessments, and rubrics.

== Public libraries ==
In public libraries, information literacy is connected to lifelong learning, development of employability skills, personal health management, and informal learning.

== See also ==
- Criteria of truth – Standards and rules used to judge the accuracy of statements and claims
- Epistemology – Philosophical study of knowledge
- Information excellence
- Information literacies
- Methodology – Study of research methods
- Project Information Literacy – US research institute
- Scholarly method – Body of principles and practices used by scholars and academics to make their claims
- Scientific method – Interplay between observation, experiment, and theory in science
- Source criticism – Process of evaluating an information source
- Textual criticism – Identification of textual variants
