= Metaliteracy =

Ability to evaluate information

Metaliteracy is the ability to evaluate information for its bias, reliability, and credibility and apply them in the context of production and sharing of knowledge. It is especially useful in the context of the internet and social media. A formal concept of it was developed as an expanded information literacy framework by State University of New York academics Thomas P. Mackey and Trudi E. Jacobson. It has been used to prepare people to be informed consumers and responsible producers of information in a variety of social communities.

== Definition and usage ==
Metaliteracy is a unified understanding of literacies to support the acquisition, production, and sharing of knowledge in collaborative online communities. Like the more skills-based approaches of information literacy, metaliteracy encourages the use of a variety of new and emerging technologies. It also incorporates related literacies such as visual literacy, digital literacy, media literacy, and transliteracy, and promotes metacognitive reflection as an empowering practice for learners. Metaliteracy supports effective participation in social media and online communities, with a comprehensive approach to learning that encourages the production and sharing of original and repurposed information in participatory environments.

Metaliteracy is intended to promote critical thinking and collaboration in the digital age and provide a comprehensive framework for effective participation in social media and online communities through acquisition, production and sharing of knowledge in collaborative online communities. While information literacy was focused on skills-based approaches and its standard definitions had been insufficient for the social technologies currently prevalent online, metaliteracy recognizes related literacy types and incorporates emerging technologies. As such metaliteracy is an overarching framework for integrating information literacy with other literacies such as media literacy, digital literacy, and visual literacy. It puts an emphasis on active production and sharing of new knowledge through technology.

Metaliteracy can be used in the practical world by helping learners with elusive topics throughout their learning and to understand the concepts better. It goes beyond information literacy and dives deep into enhancing the teaching- learning process by including the production aspect of accessible reference material which can be consumed by a wide audience over social media. Metaliteracy is particularly relevant to current literacy needs as it not only addresses the integration of information and technology, helping to optimize the use of available resources; but also introduces the use of collaborative learning to better produce and share information.

== History ==
Metaliteracy developed out of scholarly work on the changing perceptions of information literacy resulting from technological changes in the creation of and access to information. Mackey and Jacobson argued in their 2011 paper, Reframing Information Literacy as a Metaliteracy, that it was necessary to create a new framework to withstand the challenge of rising social media networks and emerging technologies and therefore include Web 2.0 technologies and social media as these developments were not included in previous information literacy models created by the ALA in 1989, ACRL in 2000 and various SCONUL models. Donna Witek and Teresa Grettano further elaborated on the idea of metaliteracy in Teaching Metaliteracy: A New Paradigm in Action. Leona Ungerer discussed the importance of digital curation and metaliteracy in higher education in her 2016 paper Digital Curation as a Core Competency in Current Learning and Literacy: A Higher Education Perspective.

On January 11, 2016, the board of the Association of College and Research Libraries adopted the Framework for Information Literacy, which draws upon the concept of metaliteracy as inextricably linked to the domains of "behavioral, affective, cognitive, and metacognitive engagement with the information ecosystem."

== Objectives ==
The objectives are categorized in four domains: behavioral, cognitive, affective and metacognitive. The frameworks of information literacy consisted of the first two mentioned domains (the behavioral and cognitive), while the affective and metacognitive domains are introduced in the discourse by the framework of metaliteracy. The behavioral domain is based on the skills and competencies expected to be achieved by completing the objectives and the cognitive domain is based on the knowledge of using comprehension, organization, application and evaluation expected to be achieved by completing the objectives. The affective domain is based on raising awareness about the changes in one’s emotions and attitudes during learning activities and the metacognitive domain is based on reflecting the process of learning while understanding the need for it.

The goals and objectives of metaliteracy have been translated into English, French, German, Italian, Portuguese, Spanish, Afrikaans, and all other official languages of South Africa.

== In education ==
As awareness of metaliteracy has spread, teachers have integrated it into a variety of contexts, including English as foreign language and adapting information literacy assessment strategies to reflect metaliteracy's emphasis on metacognition.

In the acquisition of information in modern technology, metaliteracy is mentioned as a concept. It is used in teaching about the use of social media as an information source. Metaliteracy has been used to develop and support holistic course design in collaborative, intercultural learning endeavours. The potential of metaliteracy concepts to enrich blended learning environments in China has been investigated by Ma, Li, and Liang and has been found beneficial to test how much it helps the students acquire skills relevant for information literacy. Furthermore, metaliteracy has been acknowledged as a useful concept for the promotion of information literacy in German universities. Such inclusion was also suggested in 2019 for Bosnian higher education.

Additionally, metaliteracy can be used to reduce digital divide and support lifelong learning. In an empirical study concerning the connection of older adults to iPad technology, their metaliteracy skills were examined. Metaliteracy was measured before and after using the iPad. The study showed that the participants were able to improve their metaliteracy skills including their knowledge and self-reflection. Research also highlights the importance of metaliteracy for promoting digital literacy among older adults. By framing technology usage around critical thinking, collaboration, and self-reflection, older adults have been able to build confidence with digital devices and social media. This has been shown to support social inclusion, reduce feelings of isolation, and empower older adults to become more active participants in online communities.

== Importance for understanding political media ==
Metaliteracy has been cited as being an effective tool to fight false or misleading content presented as news, especially in the context of the 2016 United States presidential election.

In Does Media Literacy Help Identification of Fake News? Information Literacy Helps, but Other Literacies Don't, metaliteracy is mentioned as a solution for a need of a comprehensive framework regarding the better handling of fake news, although they still see a need for more comprehensive measures.
