= Rosenfeld Effect =

The Rosenfeld Effect is not a scientific phenomenon, but an empirical fact that electricity use per capita in California (CA) had been almost flat from 1973 to 2006, while use in the United States rose by 50%. The effect is attributed to energy efficiency, a cause pioneered by Arthur H. Rosenfeld. Up until 2010, Dr. Rosenfeld was the commissioner and a very prominent member of the California Energy Commission board and presided over the Research, Development, and Demonstration Committee; the Dynamic Pricing Committee; and the Energy Efficiency Committee, whose main purposes are to promote energy efficiency and conservation, to support cutting edge research and, to look towards developing renewable energy sources.

A conference in 2006 at UC Berkeley was dedicated to the Rosenfeld Effect.

According to Dr. Rosenfeld, as time progresses, new technological breakthroughs make electrical appliances more efficient and longer lasting than their older counterparts. For example, when refrigerators were made in 1974, the model consumed four times as much energy compared to refrigerators manufactured in 2001. As the appliances became more efficient, they would save more energy, which consequently lowered the amount of money the average person paid for electricity to keep the appliance running. The cheaper cost of higher efficiency is also the premise behind Rosenfeld's Law, which is also attributed to Rosenfeld. Rosenfeld believed that reasonable standards for energy efficiency in numerous appliances could guarantee a drastic reduction in energy consumption. As opposed to national precedents set in the early 1990s, California's earlier standards for energy efficiency contributed much to these technological discoveries.

The Rosenfeld Effect is often associated with the following two charts:

1. Energy per capita vs time, comparing the US and California
2. Estimated energy savings in California from efficiency standards and programs

The first graph is Figure 1 of the 2007 California Integrated Energy Policy Report and is sometimes referred to as the Rosenfeld Curve. The second is widely used in Powerpoint presentations.

The Natural Resource Defense Council (NRDC), a special interest group independent of the California Energy Commission, released a document in 2005 detailing the energy per capita of the state of California as well as the energy per capita of the United States as a whole. From 1976 to 2005, California's energy per capita fluctuated around 6,500 kilowatt-hours per capita whereas the US roughly went from 8,000 kilowatt-hours to 12,000 kilowatt-hours per capita. The document also states that Rosenfeld's titles, such as titles 20 and 24, which are responsible for setting energy efficiency standards, have saved California from needing to build 21 power plants. For California's per capita energy consumption to remain constant as the growing population increased its dependence on electricity, increases in efficiency had to keep up with electricity's increasing utility. The article also credits Rosenfeld's energy saving targets, his focus on research and development, his ability to integrate energy efficiency into resource procurement, his provision of "performance-based incentives", his capability to motivate utility companies to segregate revenues from sales, his willingness to have progress towards targets measured by a third party, and his implementation of "well-designed programs" as additional reasons for California's leadership in energy efficiency. One "well-designed program" the article cites is the subsidization of compact fluorescent lamps and how different methods were undertaken to make the cost drop from US$25 a bulb in the 1980s to $3 a bulb in 2005, which saved a typical Californian family on average of about $1000 per year. The NRDC estimates California saves approximately $42 billion a year from just four of Rosenfeld's initiatives: the invention of DOE-2 (a computer program that builds energy analysis--$10 billion per year) and the implementation of high-frequency ballasts ($5 billion per year), low-e windows (estimated $5-$10 billion per year), and more efficient refrigerators ($17 billion per year). Beyond saving energy and money, Rosenfeld's actions at California's Energy Commission have also helped paint California as an example to the United States in carbon dioxide emissions, setting California's per capita emissions to half the national average in 2000.

Beyond setting standards and implementing programs, Rosenfeld and the California Energy Commission have invested money into research and development. The NRDC cites the following programs: the California Energy Commission's Public Interest Energy Research Program (PIER), Lawrence Berkeley National Laboratory's Center for Building Science, California Public Utilities Commission's Emerging Technologies Fund (CETF), and the California Clean Energy Fund (CalCEF).

According to its staff, PIER allocates grants to various companies investing in energy efficiency. The document PIER staff provides on the California Energy Commission's website includes an example of a funded company: Altex Technologies Corporation, which researches technologies for fuel cells and boiler burners. The staff behind PIER estimates the program has also directly and indirectly created roughly 50,000 jobs since its imitation in 1996.

Funding for the Lawrence Berkeley National Laboratory's Center for Building Science was to discover ways to limit energy waste. After sufficient testing, the applications team released a guide on how to design a research laboratory in a more energy efficiency manner. The guide includes suggestions for how to properly set air filtration, lighting, and supply, exhaust, and distribution systems for optimal efficiency.

The CETF stated its primary goals include managing telecommunication mergers and helping strengthen the broadband Internet infrastructure of California, with saving energy an indirect result of its procedures. The California Public Utilities Commission writes that in 2010 the CETF considered its work complete and disbanded.

CalCEF is a non-profit program that hopes to transition to a clean energy economy by creating and supporting institutions that grow markets for clean energy technologies. CalCEF is partnered with Lawrence Berkeley National Laboratory, and according to a CalCEF press release published in December 2012, the U.S. Department of Energy granted $120 million to upgrade the California storage accelerator.

While the energy per capita began to rise post-2006 for California, Rosenfeld still took initiative to manage California's energy consumption. In September 2005, the California Public Utilities Commission authorized a $2.7 billion investment from 2006-2008 to save ratepayers $5.4 billion and to save California from having to expend resources in order to build three additional power plants.

Rosenfeld's work has motivated others to conserve energy. For example, In April 2006, Ashok Gadgil of Lawrence Berkelely International Laboratory gave a presentation detailing international examples of the Rosenfeld Effect in practical use, which included programs making compact fluorescent lamps more cost-effective for poorer countries; distributing energy efficient water filters to the Philippines, Mexico, and India; and distributing metal cook-stoves with an increased efficiency factor of four in contrast to its predecessor to poor citizens of Sudan and Darfur refugees displaced by conflict in that region.

To understand the extensive work and research put behind the Rosenfeld Effect, information presented by Dr. Rosenfeld himself illustrates how several areas of crucial interest were taken into account: investigating the science and engineering of energy end-use, assessing potential and theoretical opportunities for energy efficiency, developing analytic and economic models to quantify opportunities, and researching and developing new equipment and processes to make these opportunities a success. Dr. Rosenfeld’s main motivation for improving energy efficiency was to save money as well as save resources such as oil, gas, and forests for future generations. The purpose behind the Rosenfeld effect was not only to set an example in high efficiency standards, but also to curb the threat of carbon-emissions which lead to greenhouse gases and thus further threat of global warming. By making energy use more efficient humans would be burning less fossil fuel for energy consumption. This decreased carbon emissions by more than 3 million tons per year by the year 2008, which is the equivalent of taking 650,000 cars off the road.
