= Social information architecture =

Social information architecture, also known as social iA, is a sub-domain of information architecture which deals with the social aspects of conceptualizing, modeling and organizing information. It has become more relevant because of the rise of social media and Web 2.0 in recent times.

== Approach ==
There are different approaches to the explanation of social information architecture.

=== Architecture model (internal space) ===
Architects designing a physical community space, have to consider how the architecture will shape social interactions. A long hallway of offices creates an utterly different dynamic than desks with arranged in an open space. One might foster individuality, privacy, propriety; the other: collaboration, distraction, communalism.

Still, physical spaces can be flexibly repurposed and worked around if the inhabitants desire a social dynamic not instantly afforded by the space. Office doors can be left open to invite easier interaction. Partitions can be raised between adjacent desks to limit distraction and increase privacy.

That's physical architecture. The information architectures of online communities are far more deterministic and far less flexible. They literally define the social architecture by pre-specifying in immutable computer code what information you have access to, who you can talk to, where you can go. In the online world, information architecture = social architecture.

=== Social dialogue and information model (external space) ===
All major brands use information architecture to market their products online, it is then commonly wrapped under the umbrella phrase 'digital strategy'. Information architecture used for strategic purposes encompasses brand SEO, strategic placement of virals, social media presence etc.

Charities, news outlets and social dialogue forums can make a much more specific use of the same tools for positive and important social purposes. Social Information Architecture is perceived as the socially conscious wing of commercial information architecture and function to exchange information and ideas between people and groups.

Social IA can detect problems caused by different levels of understanding and communication in culture. Due to the wide dissemination of the internet, it can also be utilised for communication and dialogue between people and groups from different societies.

Example of such issues are faith, environment, politics, climate change, war, injustice and other social challenges. Information architecture can help create frameworks in which sharing information brings people together, inspires and encourages them to participate in a forward thinking and unfragmented way. One of its core activities is to spread messages that bring people from opposite sites of social and cultural spectrums together and to confront uncomfortable subject head on.

== How does social information architecture work? ==
Social iA utilizes a variety of Web2.0 applications to filter relevant or valuable information and weave them in appropriate information repository or provide feedback to interesting channels. Social iA makes strategic use of Search Engines, Social Media, Google Algorithms, as well as websites, video & news channels. It ‘reads’ or 'listens' to social conversations and search engine queries and engages with the net actively to gather clues about the world's pulse on the internet. It assesses data, social & political trends, and respond with targeted campaigns to give people ideas, as well as help people with making sense of information.

== Principles ==
Dan Brown in his paper 8 Principles of Social Information Architecture enlists the following principles:
1. The principle of objects: Treat content as a living, breathing thing, with a lifecycle, behaviors and attributes.
2. The principle of choices: Create pages that offer meaningful choices to users, keeping the range of choices available focused on a particular task.
3. The principle of disclosure: Show only enough information to help people understand what kinds of information they'll find as they dig deeper.
4. The principle of exemplars: Describe the contents of categories by showing examples of the contents.
5. The principle of front doors: Assume at least half of the website's visitors will come through some page other than the home page.
6. The principle of multiple classification: Offer users several different classification schemes to browse the site's content.
7. The principle of focused navigation: Don't mix apples and oranges in your navigation scheme.
8. The principle of growth: Assume the content you have today is a small fraction of the content you will have tomorrow.

== What can social information architecture achieve? ==
Social information architecture has many potentials in terms of fostering social connections and how information is shared in social spaces on the web.

== See also ==
Wodtke, Christina and Govella, Austin Information Architecture: Blueprints for the Web (2009) Second Edition, Published by New Riders
