= Findability =

Ease of finding information on a website

Findability is the ease with which information contained on a website can be found, both from outside the website (using search engines and the like) and by users already on the website. Although findability has relevance outside the World Wide Web, the term is usually used in that context. Most relevant websites do not come up in the top results because designers and engineers do not cater to the way ranking algorithms work currently. Its importance can be determined from the first law of e-commerce, which states "If the user can't find the product, the user can't buy the product." As of December 2014, out of 10.3 billion monthly Google searches by Internet users in the United States, an estimated 78% are made to research products and services online.

Findability encompasses aspects of information architecture, user interface design, accessibility and search engine optimization, among others.

== Introduction ==
Findability is similar to discoverability, which is defined as the ability of something, especially a piece of content or information, to be found. It is different from web search in that the word find refers to locating something in a known space while 'search' is in an unknown space or not in an expected location.

Mark Baker, the author of Every Page is Page One, mentions that findability "is a content problem, not a search problem". Even when the right content is present, users often find themselves deep within the content of a website but not in the right place. He further adds that findability is intractable, perfect findability is unattainable, but we need to focus on reducing the effort for finding that a user would have to do for themselves.

Findability can be divided into external findability and on-site findability, based on where the customers need to find the information.

== History ==
Heather Lutze is thought to have created the term in the early 2000s. The popularization of the term findability for the Web is usually credited to Peter Morville. In 2005 he defined it as: "the ability of users to identify an appropriate Web site and navigate the pages of the site to discover and retrieve relevant information resources", though it appears to have been first coined in a public context referring to the web and information retrieval by Alkis Papadopoullos in a 2005 article entitled "Findability".

== External findability ==
External findability is the domain of Internet marketing and search engine optimization tactics. External findability can be very influential for businesses. Smaller companies may have trouble influencing external findability, due to being less aware to consumers. Other means are taken to make sure that they are found in search results.

Several factors affect external findability:

1. Search engine indexing: As the very first step, webpages need to be found by indexing crawler in order to be shown in the search results. It would be helpful to avoid factors that may lead to webpages being ignored by indexing crawlers. Those factors may include elements that require user interaction, such as entering log-in credentials. Algorithms for indexing vary by the search engine which means the number of webpages of a website successfully being indexed may be very different between Google and Yahoo!'s search engines. Also, in countries like China, government policies could significantly influence the indexing algorithms. In this case, local knowledge about laws and policies could be valuable.
2. Page descriptions in search results: Once the webpages are successfully indexed by web crawlers and show in the search results with decent ranking, the next step is to attract customers to click the link to the web pages. However, the customers can't see the whole web pages at this point; they can only see an excerpt of the webpage's content and metadata. Therefore, displaying meaningful information in a limited space, usually a couple of sentences, in search results is important for increasing click traffic of the webpages, and thus the findability of the web content on your webpages.
3. Keyword matching: At a semantic level, terminology used by the searcher and the content producer be different. Bridging the gap between the terms used by customers and developers is helpful for making web content more findable to more potential content consumers.

== On-site findability ==
On-site findability is concerned with the ability of a potential customer to find what they are looking for within a specific site. More than 90 percent of customers use internal searches in a website compared to browsing. Of those, only 50 percent find what they are looking for. Improving the quality of on-site searches highly improves the business of the website. Several factors affect findability on a website:

1. Site search: If searchers within a site do not find what they are looking for, they tend to leave rather than browse through the website. Users who had successful site searches are twice as likely to ultimately convert.
2. Related links and products: User experience can be enhanced by trying to understand the needs of the customer and provide suggestions for other, related information.
3. Site match to customer needs and preferences: Site design, content creation, and recommendations are major factors for affecting the customer experience.

== Evaluation and measures ==
Baseline findability is the existing findability before changes are made in order to improve it. This is measured by participants who represent the customer base of the website, who try to locate a sample set of items using the existing navigation of the website.

In order to evaluate how easily information can be found by searching a site using a search engine or information retrieval system, retrievability measures were developed, and similarly, navigability measures now measure ease of information access through browsing a site (e.g. PageRank, MNav, InfoScent (see Information foraging), etc.).

Findability also can be evaluated via the following techniques:

- Usability testing: Conducted to find out how and why users navigate through a website to accomplish tasks.
- Tree testing: An information architecture based technique, to determine if critical information can be found on the website.
- Closed card sorting: A usability technique based on information architecture, for evaluating the strength of categories.
- Click testing: Accounts for the implicit data collected through clicks on the user interface.

== Beyond findability ==
Findability Sciences defines a findability index in terms of each user's influence, context, and sentiments. For seamless search, current websites focus on a combination of structured hypertext-based information architectures and rich Internet application-enabled visualization techniques.

== See also ==
- Information retrieval – Finding information for an information need
- Knowledge mining – Process of analyzing large data sets
- Search engine optimization – Practice and strategies of increasing online visibility
- Subject (documents)
- Usability – Capacity of a system for its users to perform tasks
- User interface – Means by which a user interacts with and controls a machine
