= Information excellence =

Information excellence is the ability of a person, as a talent, or an organization to use information in an optimal way to achieve their own competitive advantages. Looking at the supply of information as a customer-oriented process in terms of business performance, excellence means the ability of an information provider (sometimes can be viewed as a broadcaster), the interests of its customer information to know best and their related requirements to satisfy optimally. From the perspective of the customer information, information excellence pursued the objective of enabling the customer to develop its information needs specifically and consistently under selection to satisfy any information provider.

== Motivation and background ==
The economy of the information society of the 21st-century demands of the people in most industries increasingly complex interactions with the planning and control of their business. People are increasingly becoming knowledge workers who steadily with a large amount of information must handle changing. The availability of high-quality information is therefore increasingly important for the quality of critical business processes because it enables people within the processes to make the right decisions and perform appropriate actions. The term therefore includes information excellence all measures of a company, which contribute in terms of business excellence to the data quality increase. Quality refers to the relevance of information both at the level of an organization and an individual in specific situations within an organization and its processes.

== Requirements ==
Among the instruments to obtain information from various measures include Excellence at the level of organization and culture of a company, which is also undertaken in the EFQM model application. The overall goal of customer orientation means for internal and external information policy of an organization, this exactly matched to the interests of their customers through information, this continuously to measure and align with your own information service. For effective implementation of these measures are useful and modern IT systems, information architecture, which defines the rules by which content can be exchanged between providers and customers. In the field of IT systems play an important role in particular semantic procedures.

== See also ==
- Customer orientation
- EFQM Excellence Model
- Information Quality
- Information literacy
- Information overload
- Information needs
