= Rosenfield =

Rosenfield is a surname. Notable people with the surname include:

- Andrew M. Rosenfield, American CEO
- Allan Rosenfield, American medical care leader (1933-2008)
- Clare Rosenfield, LCSW, American philanthropist
- Ethel Rosenfield (1910–2000), Canadian sculptor
- Jim Rosenfield, American TV news anchor
- John M. Rosenfield (1924 –2013), American art historian
- Joseph Rosenfield (1904–2000), American lawyer and businessman

== Fictional characters ==
- Albert Rosenfield from television show Twin Peaks

== See also ==
- Rosenfeld (disambiguation)
