= Staging Point (Rozenfeld) =

Drawing by Rozenfeld

Coordinates: 52.2442°N 21.0028°E

- Punkt etapowy (Polish)
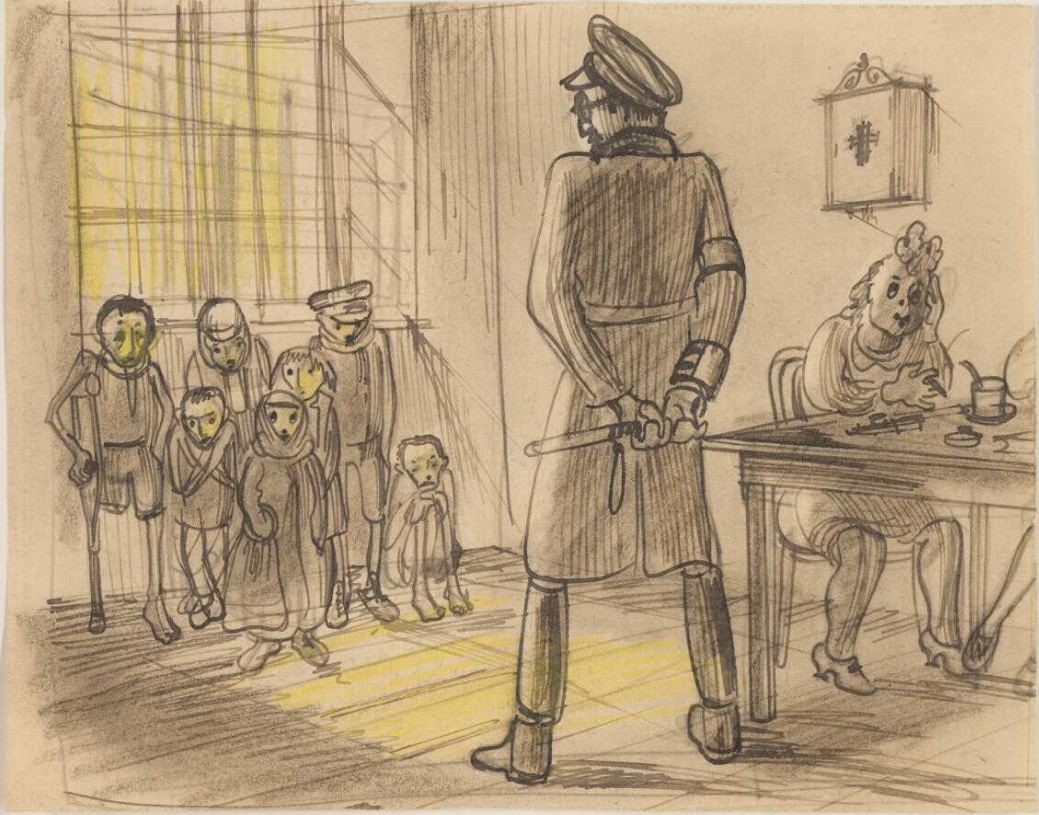
- Artist: Rozenfeld
- Year: 1941 (?)
- Medium: ink, charcoal and pastel on paper
- Dimensions: 20.0 cm × 15.8 cm (7.9 in × 6.2 in)
- Location: Jewish Historical Institute, Warsaw
- Accession: ARG 581 Ring I/277_1

Staging Point (Polish: Punkt etapowy) is one of five drawings depicting the life of children in the Warsaw Ghetto in the collection of the Jewish Historical Institute, Warsaw. The author of the drawings is an unknown draftsman, but they are signed "Rozenfeld". The drawing was made, most probably, between autumn and winter of 1941 and commissioned as part of the Ringelblum Archive - which has been inscribed in the UNESCO Memory of the World Register in 1999.

The drawing is set at 5/7 Stawki Street, which was used to hold Jewish children arrested by the "Blue police" outside the ghetto district. The "staging point" was the place where arrested children would wait for their parents, who were obliged to pay a fine. Orphans would instead be sent to an orphanage.

The drawing depicts a group of seven children arrested by the Jewish Ghetto Police for the crime of smuggling food.
