= Yonah Rozenfeld =

Yonah Rozenfeld (1880-July 9, 1944) was a Yiddish writer, known for his psychological stories.

== Biography ==
Rozenfeld was born in 1880, in Staryi Chortoryisk, Ukraine. Rozenfeld was educated at a yeshiva but he left at the age of thirteen following the death of his parents from cholera. With the support of I.L. Peretz, he published his first story in 1904 in the St. Petersburg Yiddish daily Der fraynd. His early stories were autobiographical accounts of working class Jews, and lacked the psychological focus of his later work. After living in Kovel and Kyiv, he emigrated to the United States in 1921.

Rozenfeld was a frequent contributor of stories to Forverts until the 1930s when he left the paper following an argument with Abraham Cahan. Earlier, in 1922, Cahan had praised Rozenfeld as one of Yiddish literature's "greatest artists", along with Sholem Asch. While he remained employed and paid by Cahan's paper, the editor refused to publish many of his manuscripts, leading to tension between the two men. According to Irving Howe, this fight became the subject of gossip among Yiddish intellectuals.

Rozenfeld's prose has been described as "deftly searching", with a "lucid and lyrical flow". In 1923, Lewis Browne described him as the Yiddish writer who "leads a group of psychological fiction writers". In addition to his stories, Rozenfeld was the author of the autobiographical novel Eyner aleyn, the story of an apprentice in Russia and his relationship with his boss' family.

Rozenfeld's papers are held at the YIVO Institute for Jewish Research and include an unpublished 101-page autobiography.
