= Otto Rosenfeld =

Otto Rosenfeld may refer to:

- Otto Rosenfeld (aviator), German World War I flying ace, see List of World War I aces credited with 11–14 victories
- Otto Rank (1884–1939), born Otto Rosenfeld, Austrian psychoanalyst
