= Paweł Rozenfeld =

Polish industrialist, 1907–1939

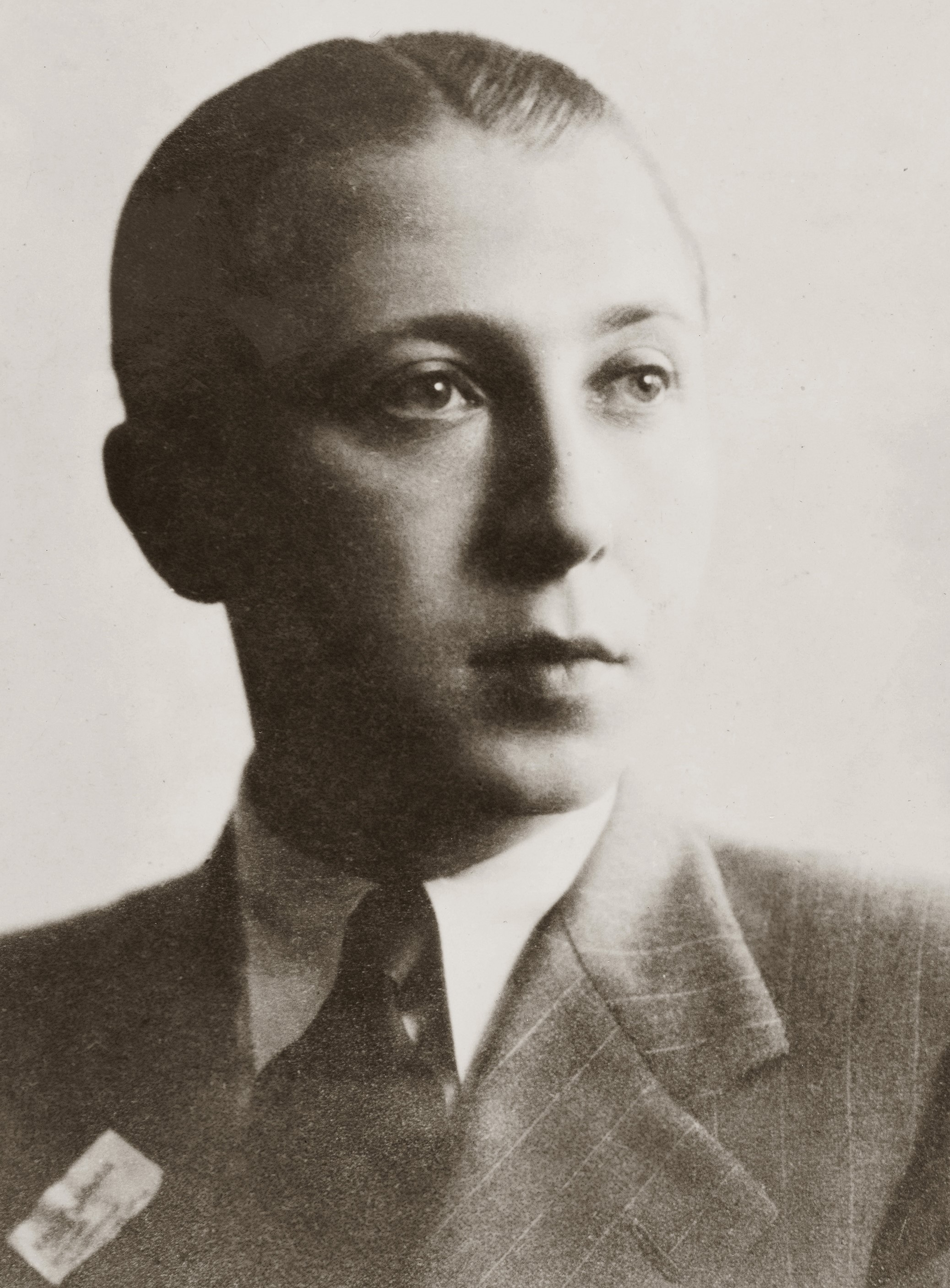
- Born: 20 June 1907; Łódź
- Died: 22 November 1939 (aged 32) probably in the camp in Radogoszcz

Paweł Rozenfeld (born June 20, 1907, in Łódź; died November 22, 1939) was a Jewish industrialist from Łódź, owner of the Mechanical Stocking Factory "Mozes Rozenfeld i Syn – Spadkobiercy".

Paweł Rozenfeld was the son of Mozes (Mojżesz) Rozenfeld, founder of the Mechanical Stocking Factory in Łódź, at 72 Średnia Street (now Pomorska Street). Established in 1904, the factory was among the leading hosiery enterprises in the city. After the death of his elder brother Abraham in 1935 and supported by his cousin Dr. Natan Rozenfeld, Paweł took over the management of the family business. Two years later, following his father's death, he became the owner of the factory. Under his leadership, the company produced cotton, silk, and wool stockings, maintaining a high standard of quality.

In 1937, Paweł Rozenfeld married Edyta Lasocka. They were respected members of the Jewish community. In 1939, their daughter Monika was born.

On November 10, 1939, Rozenfeld was arrested during the German Intelligenzaktion operation. He was imprisoned in a detention camp for members of the intelligentsia, in the former Michał Glazer factory in Radogoszcz near Łódź. Two weeks after his arrest, his wife Edyta, attempting to deliver a food parcel to him, was informed of his death. Rozenfeld's body was never found. According to the testimony of a fellow prisoner, Dawid Weinstein, he was shot in the camp.

Along with her daughter and mother-in-law, Edyta fled to Warsaw to avoid arrest. They were confined in the Warsaw Ghetto but managed to escape and live on the Aryan side. After the end of World War II, they emigrated to the United Kingdom.

== Commemoration ==
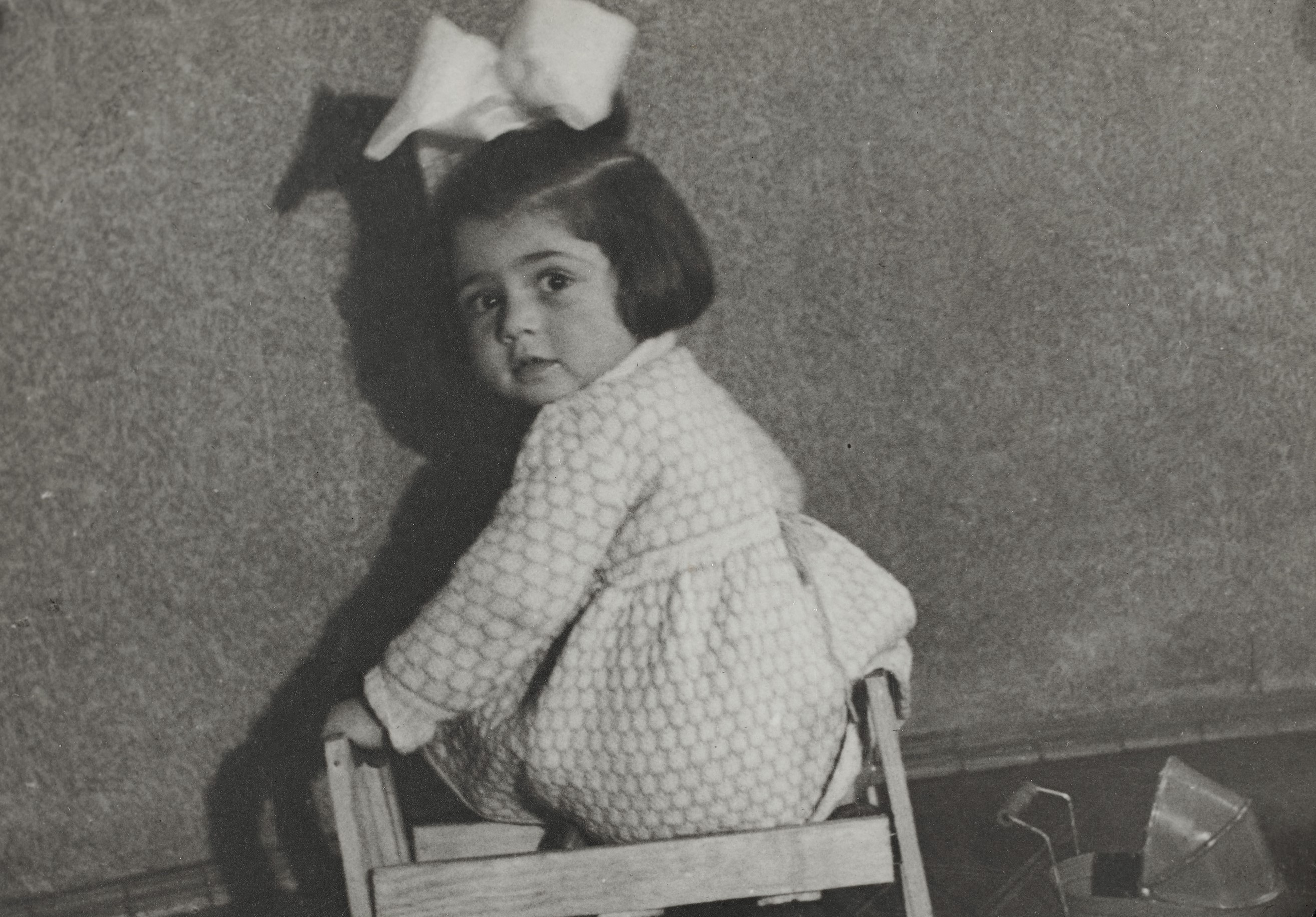
Monika in the Warsaw Ghetto, 1941

Paweł Rozenfeld's grandson Oliver Sears, founder of Holocaust Awareness Ireland, curated the exhibition The Objects of Love with his wife, Catherine Punch. This was first presented at Dublin Castle in 2022 before being shown at the 92Y in New York the following year. Through photographs, documents, and personal objects, the exhibition tells the story of the Rozenfeld family before, during, and after the Holocaust.

In Łódź, at the Radogoszcz Martyrdom Branch of the Museum of Independence Traditions in Łódź, an outdoor exhibition titled Przedmioty miłości (The Objects of Love) was opened on October 15, 2025. Its texts were written by Oliver Sears, with translation and editing by Ludwika Majewska, and graphic design by Edyta Łaszkiewicz. The exhibition is accompanied by a catalogue that recounts the grandson's journey of uncovering his family's tragic history through the titular "objects of love".

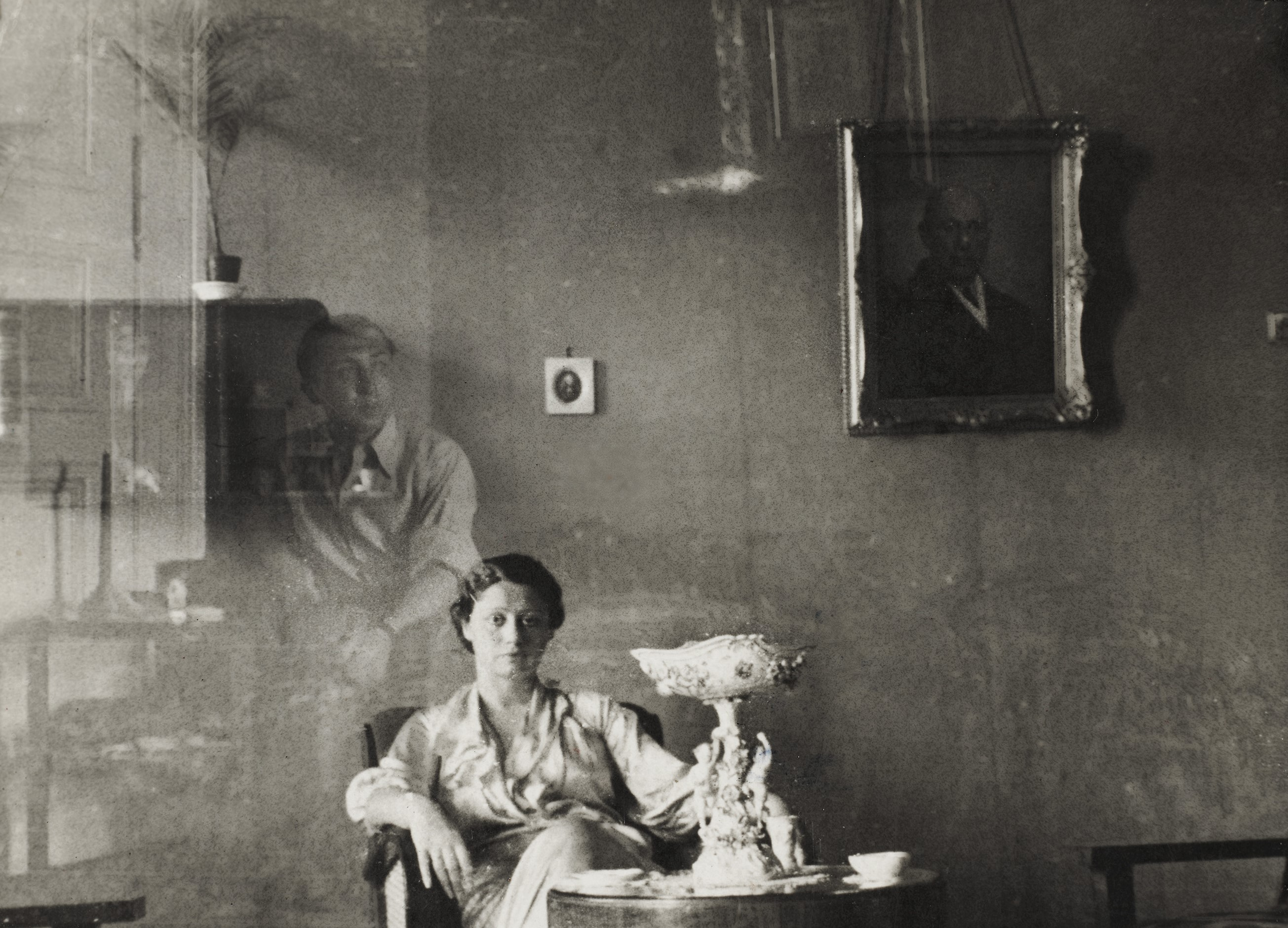
Double exposure Paweł and Edyta, Łódź 1938

== Bibliography ==
- Sears, O., Majewska, L., & Łaszkiewicz, E. (2025). Objects of Love (exhibition catalogue). Museum of Independence Traditions in Łódź. ISBN 978-83-972060-3-8.
