= Rosenfeld (novel) =

- English-language cover
- Author: Maya Kessler
- Language: English
- Published: 12 July 2022
- Publisher: Kinneret Zmora-Bitan Dvir
- Media type: Print (paperback) and e-book
- ISBN: 978-965-574-436-1

Rosenfeld (Hebrew: רוזנפלד) is Maya Kessler's debut novel originally released in 2022 in Israel. First published in Hebrew, on 12 July 2022 by Kinneret Zamora-Beitan Dvir, the book was a bestseller in Israel. It was then translated into various languages, including German, Dutch, and English, and was published in the US by the American book publisher Simon & Schuster in November 2024.

== Synopsis ==
The novel is a love story between Noa, a filmmaker and overweight 55-year-old Teddy Rosenfeld, CEO of a commercial biotechnology company Delmar. They meet at a friend's wedding, and Noa joins Teddy's company as its video marketing director. There are many gaps between Teddy and Noa: money, age, status and also free time and desire for this relationship. Teddy has a busy career and is not looking for a romantic relationship of any kind. Noa tries to lure Teddy into a relationship regardless. The book has many detailed sexual scenes. As the plot develops, Noa's deep psychological motivations are revealed. The recovery from the damaged relationship pattern with Teddy may help her repair the relationship she had with her mother as a child.

== Reception ==
Rosenfeld has drawn a divided critical response: the Chicago Review of Books listed it among its "12 Must‑Read Books of November 2024," calling it "all intensity and desire," while The Millions described it as "a debut—rated R for Rosenfeld," praising its "tumultuous and ultimately profound power play." The Jewish Book Council noted that the novel's erotic scenes are "graphic, visceral— and maybe sexy, depending on your taste," yet contribute to a deeper exploration of intimacy and control. A review in Publishers Weekly was mixed, praising the chemistry of the sex scenes and criticizing the other parts of the novel as dull.
