= Louis Rosenfeld =

American author and information architect

- Born: Louis B. Rosenfeld; May 20, 1965 (age 61)
- Occupations: Information architect, author, and publisher
- Website: https://rosenfeldmedia.com/people/louis-rosenfeld/

Louis B. Rosenfeld (born 1965) is an American information architect, consultant, author and publisher, known as co-author of Information Architecture for the World Wide Web.

== Biography ==
Rosenfeld earned his B.A. in history from the University of Michigan in 1987, and his Master's in library science from the University of Michigan School of Information in 1990.

Along with Peter Morville, he was the co-founder of Argus Associates, one of the first firms devoted exclusively to the practice of information architecture. With Christina Wodtke and several others, Rosenfeld founded the Information Architecture Institute in 2002 and was a member of its advisory board, where he helped start the Information Architecture Summit (now IAC) He was also co-founder of the User Experience Network (UXnet).

In 2005, he founded Rosenfeld Media, a user experience publishing house. Under the auspices of Rosenfeld Media, Rosenfeld has published approximately 60 titles, and curated several conferences, including:

- Enterprise UX conference
- DesignOps Summit
- Advancing Research conference
- Civic Design conference
- Design in Product conference
- Designing with AI conference
- Advancing Service Design conference

== Selected publications ==
Books:

- Louis Rosenfeld, Morville, Peter, and Jorge Arango. Information architecture for the World Wide Web: For the Web and Beyond. O'Reilly Media, Inc., 2015.
- Louis Rosenfeld. Search Analytics for Your Site: Conversation With Your Consumers. 2011
- Morville, P., Janes, J., Rosenfeld, L., Candido, G. A., Rosenfeld, L. B., & Decandido, G. A. (1999). The Internet Searcher's Handbook: Locating Information, People, and Software. Neal-Schuman Publishers, Inc..

Articles, a selection:

- Rosenfeld, Louis. "Moment Prisons, and How to Escape Them." Medium (2019).
- Rosenfeld, Louis. "Seeing the Elephant: Defragmenting User Research." A List Apart (2013).
- Rosenfeld, Louis. "Information architecture: looking ahead." Journal of the American Society for Information Science and technology 53.10 (2002): 874–876.
- Janes, Joseph W., and Louis B. Rosenfeld. "Networked information retrieval and organization: Issues and questions." Journal of the American Society for Information Science 47.9 (1996): 711–715.
