= Arthur H. Rosenfeld =

American physicist

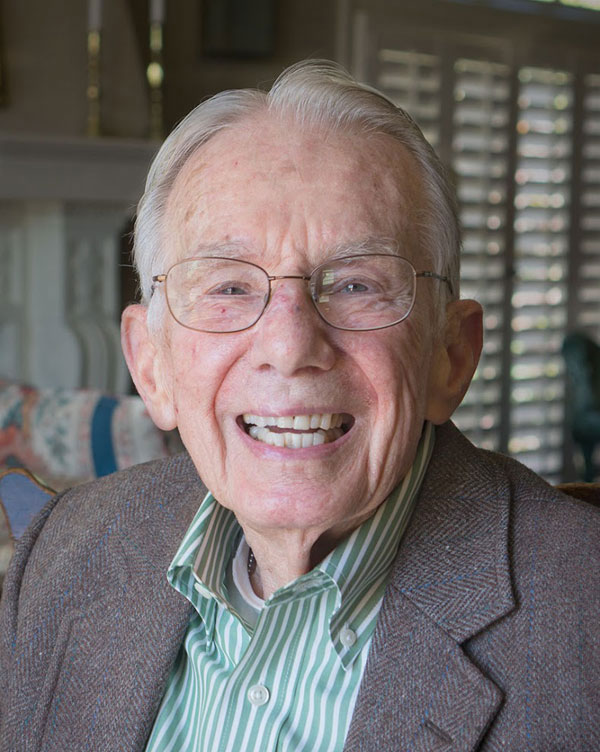
- Born: Arthur Hinton Rosenfeld; June 22, 1926; Birmingham, Alabama, U.S.
- Died: January 27, 2017 (aged 90); Berkeley, California, U.S.
- Known for: Compact fluorescent lamps, Low-energy refrigerators
- Awards: Enrico Fermi Award (2005); Global Energy Prize (2011); National Medal of Technology (2011); Tang Prize (2016)
- Scientific career
- Workplaces: California Energy Commission, Lawrence Berkeley National Laboratory
- Doctoral advisor: Enrico Fermi
- Doctoral students: Ashok Gadgil, David B. Goldstein
- Website: Arthur H. Rosenfeld

Arthur Hinton Rosenfeld (June 22, 1926 – January 27, 2017) was a University of California, Berkeley physicist and California energy commissioner, dubbed the "Godfather of Energy Efficiency", for developing new standards which helped improve energy efficiency in California and subsequently worldwide.

Rosenfeld was born in Birmingham, Alabama, in 1926. Starting in 1954 he served as a professor of physics at the UC Berkeley and a senior staff member at Lawrence Berkeley National Laboratory. In 1994, he served in the Clinton administration as senior advisor at the U.S. Department of Energy. In 2000, he was appointed Commissioner of the California Energy Commission, serving until his retirement in 2010.

His work helped lead to such breakthroughs as low-energy electric lights, such as compact fluorescent lamps, low-energy refrigerators, and windows that trap heat. In his fight against global warming, he has saved Americans billions of dollars in electricity bills.

== Early years and education ==
Rosenfeld was born in Birmingham, Alabama on June 22, 1926. He spent his early years in New Orleans during the Great Depression. His father was an expert in sugar cane cultivation, which took the family to Egypt when he was six years old. As a student in Egypt, he made friends with students from Europe, and learned about their inclination to saving energy. "Europeans only used half as much energy ... and it was clear that their lifestyle was as good as ours," he later said.

While still in high school, he took college-level courses, which helped him earn a bachelor's degree from Virginia Polytechnic Institute when he was 17. He served in the U.S. Navy for two years at the end of World War II, where he taught radar operations. He next entered graduate school at the University of Chicago, and studied particle physics under Enrico Fermi, a Nobel Prize-winning Italian physicist. Rosenfeld coauthored a book on nuclear physics with Fermi, who was noted for building the world's first nuclear reactor.

In 1954, after earning his Doctor of Philosophy in physics, and with a recommendation from Fermi, Rosenfeld accepted a position as a teaching physicist at the University of California, Berkeley.

== Career ==
=== Physics professor ===
At Berkeley, Rosenfeld joined the University of California Department of Physics and the particle physics research group at Lawrence Berkeley National Lab (LBNL) led by Nobel Laureate Luis Walter Alvarez. Alvarez went on to win the Nobel Prize with research backed by his team of scientists that included Rosenfeld.

In 1957, he became professor of physics, later professor emeritus, and was one of the founding members of the international Particle Data Group. He developed the reputation of being a workaholic, arriving to work very early, taking a dinner break with his family, and continuing to work until 2 a.m.

=== Energy efficiency leader ===
Art was one of the most decent, generous, engaging, passionate, and thoughtful people that I have known. His wonderful persistence in asking interesting, important questions and being completely open to new ideas makes him a compelling colleague. The climate crisis has given his work even greater significance. Indeed, it is no exaggeration to say that the field Art pioneered is now indispensable in how we transition to a sustainable future.

— Steven Chu, U.S. Secretary of Energy (2009-2013)

A turning point in his career came as a result of the second Arab oil embargo in 1973, when he realized that one of the key vulnerabilities of Americans was their inefficient and wasteful use of limited energy. The embargo caused an energy crisis, with long lines at gas stations and higher energy prices nationwide.

He was annoyed at seeing colleagues in his building leaving lights on at the end of the day, and took it upon himself to go throughout the building turning them off. At the same time, California utilities were projecting a 7 percent annual growth in electric demand, and were planning to build a number of nuclear power plants along the coast.

His mission changed when he became convinced, as he said, "it would be more profitable to attack our own wasteful energy use than to attack OPEC." He noted that "if we Americans used energy as efficiently as do the Europeans or Japanese, we would have been exporting oil in 1973." While most researchers at the time were trying to find ways of producing more energy, Rosenfeld committed himself from then on to reducing energy use.

As a result, his research focus shifted away from particle physics and instead to energy efficiency. To organize a team of scientists to work on it, he established the Center for Building Science at Lawrence Berkeley National Laboratory, which he would lead until 1994. Ashok Gadgil, a senior scientist at the lab, who had once been one of Rosenfeld's graduate students, explains that Rosenfeld was the first to calculate how much energy would be saved with new standards. "It was a revelation," says Gadgil, when they looked at the projected savings.

==== Energy efficiency standards developed ====
The center under his leadership developed a number of energy efficiency technologies, including heat trapping window coating and compact fluorescent lights. Rosenfeld helped develop computer models used to understand and calculate the energy use of buildings. Those computer models were later adopted as national standards for building energy analysis by the Department of Energy.

Rosenfeld's attention to energy conservation inspired thousands of energy researchers during his career. "He truly shaped the way an entire generation of researchers and policymakers worked together to conserve resources," said Berkeley Lab director Mike Witherell. Engineers, beginning with those in his lab, now began to analyze the energy efficiency of everyday things. That led to breakthroughs in not only low-energy lights, but also windows, refrigerators, air conditioners, and other appliances, along with the design of entire buildings. It led to California becoming a model of energy conservation for the nation, and in 1978 it was the first state to approve a strong energy-efficiency building code, called Title 24.

Without doubt, Dr. Arthur Rosenfeld knew more and did more about energy conservation and efficiency than anyone else in the country ... He succeeded beyond anyone's expectations, especially in the state of California ... Tens of millions of people are in debt to him. He was a true public citizen.

— Ralph Nader

He developed DOE-2, a computer program for building energy analysis and design that was incorporated into the new code. The codes themselves became models for other states, copied by Florida and Massachusetts, among them. DOE-2 is used to calculate codes and guidelines for energy efficient new buildings by various countries, including China.

Other states and countries became aware that although homes in California were loaded with new energy-consuming appliances, such as computers, large-screen TVs, iPods, PlayStations, central air conditioners, hot tubs and swimming pools, their per person energy use had remained the same as it was 30 years earlier. Much of the savings was attributed to Rosenfeld's "passion to wring the most out of every kilowatt." He gave energy regulators the data they needed to enact some of the strongest efficiency standards in the world.

Those standards impacted various industries: New homes and buildings were required to have better insulation and to be fitted with energy-saving lights; heating and cooling systems had to be more efficient; appliances were redesigned to use less power; and utilities were told to motivate their customers to use less electricity. Rosenfeld acted on his basic principle: "Conserving energy is cheaper and smarter than building power plants."

While the pressure to build nuclear facilities was growing as the population grew, utilities and policymakers began to agree that new power plants were not always needed. In 1976, for instance, after he explained to California governor Jerry Brown that a proposed nuclear power plant would not be needed if there were better efficiency standards for refrigerators, the proposed plant was not built. And the following year, standards for new refrigerators and freezers went into effect. Brown recalls Rosenfeld's influence:

He gave validation to the very unorthodox notion that economic growth could be decoupled from energy growth. He was really the guru of efficiency.

==== Energy savings and reduced pollution ====
Art Rosenfeld helped make California the world leader in energy efficiency. His pathbreaking ideas transformed our energy sector from one of massive waste to increasingly elegant efficiency.

— Jerry Brown, Governor of California

Many of the new standards met with stiff resistance from utilities and business groups. They saw the new rules as being bureaucratic "job killers," and which, if effective, would reduce their revenues. An executive from the utilities contacted Rosenfeld's lab to demand they fire him.

Appliance manufacturers also complained about the new requirements, although they innovated to meet them. The resistance from utilities and manufacturers was eventually overcome when it was calculated that those new standards had yielded billions annually in energy savings for California consumers. "The first time we put standards on a product, we tend to get objections that this will be the ruin of civilization as we know it," Rosenfeld said. "But then people get used to it." In 1999, he estimated that the changes the commission mandated were saving the nation $10 billion a year.

The new standards also reduced California's air pollution, equivalent to taking millions of cars off the road. Appliances such as the refrigerator later used only 25% of the energy as older models, despite often being larger. Large-screen TVs, which were estimated to previously use up to 10% of an average home's electricity, were also included in the standards. In 2009, California approved the nation's first efficiency requirement for televisions. It was estimated that they alone would save Californian's $8 billion over the following decade.

Since 1973 per capita electricity use in California has remained flat, while for the rest of the nation it increased nearly 50%. That trend was attributed in part to the energy conservation efforts led by Rosenfeld. Energy scientists credited Rosenfeld for those savings, dubbing the term "Rosenfeld Effect" as a way to explain how the cost reductions were achieved. He became a "rock star" in energy efficiency circles. James Sweeney, an energy scientist at Stanford, says Rosenfeld is "absolutely the most fundamental person in causing the California government to start paying attention fully to the opportunities for energy efficiency."

==== Energy efficiency organizations ====
Dr. Rosenfeld's career provides an example of the breadth of science - from the fundamental to the practical - that the Department of Energy supports. He is one of the "founding fathers" of energy efficiency, and the legacy of his research and policy work is an entire new energy efficiency sector of our economy, which now yields an astounding annual savings of around $100 billion, and growing.

— Samuel W. Bodman,
U.S. Secretary of Energy (2005-2009)

Governor Brown subsequently set up California's first Energy Commission, requiring as part of its mandate the use of the new efficiency standards for buildings and appliances. Rosenfeld was appointed its commissioner by governor Gray Davis in 2000 and was reappointed by governor Arnold Schwarzenegger in 2005.

His efforts, having saved consumers billions of dollars in energy costs, earned Rosenfeld the moniker, "godfather of energy efficiency," as well as numerous awards.

In 1980 Rosenfeld helped form the American Council for an Energy-Efficient Economy (ACEEE), a non-profit organization aimed at promoting energy efficiency policies and technologies. In 2014, leading members of the organization paid tribute to his work, with many of its members crediting him for giving them inspiration during their careers. At that event, Rosenfeld said that his own inspiration for establishing the organization was his "fury" at president Jimmy Carter's plan to spend $88 billion on alternative fuel development, but almost nothing toward energy conservation. He realized that someone with his expertise was needed to re-focus attention to conserving energy, which he felt was the best and easiest way to reduce energy consumption.

Rosenfeld is the author or co-author of about 400 peer-reviewed scientific papers. He was a participant, and later member of the Board of Directors for the non-profit research organization Berkeley Earth. From 1994 to 1999, Rosenfeld was a senior advisor for Energy Efficiency and Renewable Energy in the United States Department of Energy.

In later years, he was a leading advocate for the use of white or light colored roofing materials to reduce building cooling costs. Former U.S. secretary of energy, Steven Chu, explains that by Rosenfeld's calculation, having white roofs on all flat-roofed buildings and for pavements, would be the equivalent of removing all the cars in the world for 18 years. In 2005 California added cool roofs to its Title 24 building standards.

== Personal life and death ==
Rosenfeld died at his home in Berkeley, California on January 27, 2017, aged 90. The cause of his death was pneumonia. His wife of 53 years, Roselyn Bernheim "Roz" Rosenfeld, had died in 2009. His son Chip Rosenfeld died in 1994 at age 27 while a graduate student at Harvard University.

He is survived by two daughters, Dr. Margaret Rosenfeld at the University of Washington Children's Hospital in Seattle and Dr. Anne Hansen at Harvard Children's Hospital in Boston; His sons-in-law Professor Daniel S. Weld, University of Washington, and Professor Jonathan Hansen, Harvard. He had six grandchildren: Oliver, Julian and Nathalie Hansen & Adam, Galen and Leah Weld, ages 22 to 16 as of 2017.

== Honors and recognition ==
I believe Art Rosenfeld deserves the Nobel Peace Prize more than many people who've received it. Energy conservation has prevented conflict around the world.

— Richard A. Muller, Berkeley physicist
- Rosenfeld's law. He is credited with an observation known as Rosenfeld's law, which states that the amount of energy required to produce one dollar of GDP has decreased by about one percent per year since 1845.

External image
- Illustration of the Rosenfeld Effect

- Rosenfeld Effect. To explain how California's per capita electricity usage managed to stay flat for 40 years, while usage for the nation went 50 percent higher, the term "Rosenfeld effect" was created.
- The Rosenfeld: a unit of measure. (Note: One Rosenfeld equals an energy saving of 3 billion kilowatt-hours per year, which represents the electrical output of one 500-megawatt coal-fired power plant. It prevents emissions from what would otherwise be 3 million metric tons of carbon dioxide per year.) In 2010, over fifty leaders from 26 institutions worldwide in the field of energy efficiency, proposed a new unit to represent electricity savings, and named it the "Rosenfeld".
- Honorary degree, Durham University, 1983

== Awards ==
- Szilard Award for Physics in the Public Interest, 1986
- Carnot Award for Energy Efficiency, U.S. Department of Energy, 1993
- Berkeley Citation, University of California, 2001
- Enrico Fermi Award, 2006
- Economist Innovator of the Year Award, 2008
- National Association of Engineering (NAE) Membership, 2010
- Global Energy Prize (Russia), 2011
- National Medal of Technology (U.S.), 2011
- Tang Prize in Sustainable Development, 2016
