= Rosenfeld's law =

Axiom of the economics of energy

Rosenfeld's law is an axiom relating physics to economics, that states that the amount of energy required to produce one dollar of GDP has decreased by about one percent per year since 1845.

The original quote by Arthur H. Rosenfeld is:

From 1845 to the present, the amount of energy required to produce the same amount of gross national product has steadily decreased at the rate of about 1 percent per year. This is not quite as spectacular as Moore's Law of integrated circuits, but it has been tested over a longer period of time. One percent per year yields a factor of 2.7 when compounded over 100 years. It took 56 BTUs (59,000 joules) of energy consumption to produce one (1992) dollar of GDP in 1845. By 1998, the same dollar required only 12.5 BTUs (13,200 joules).
