= Jesse James Garrett =

American computer scientist

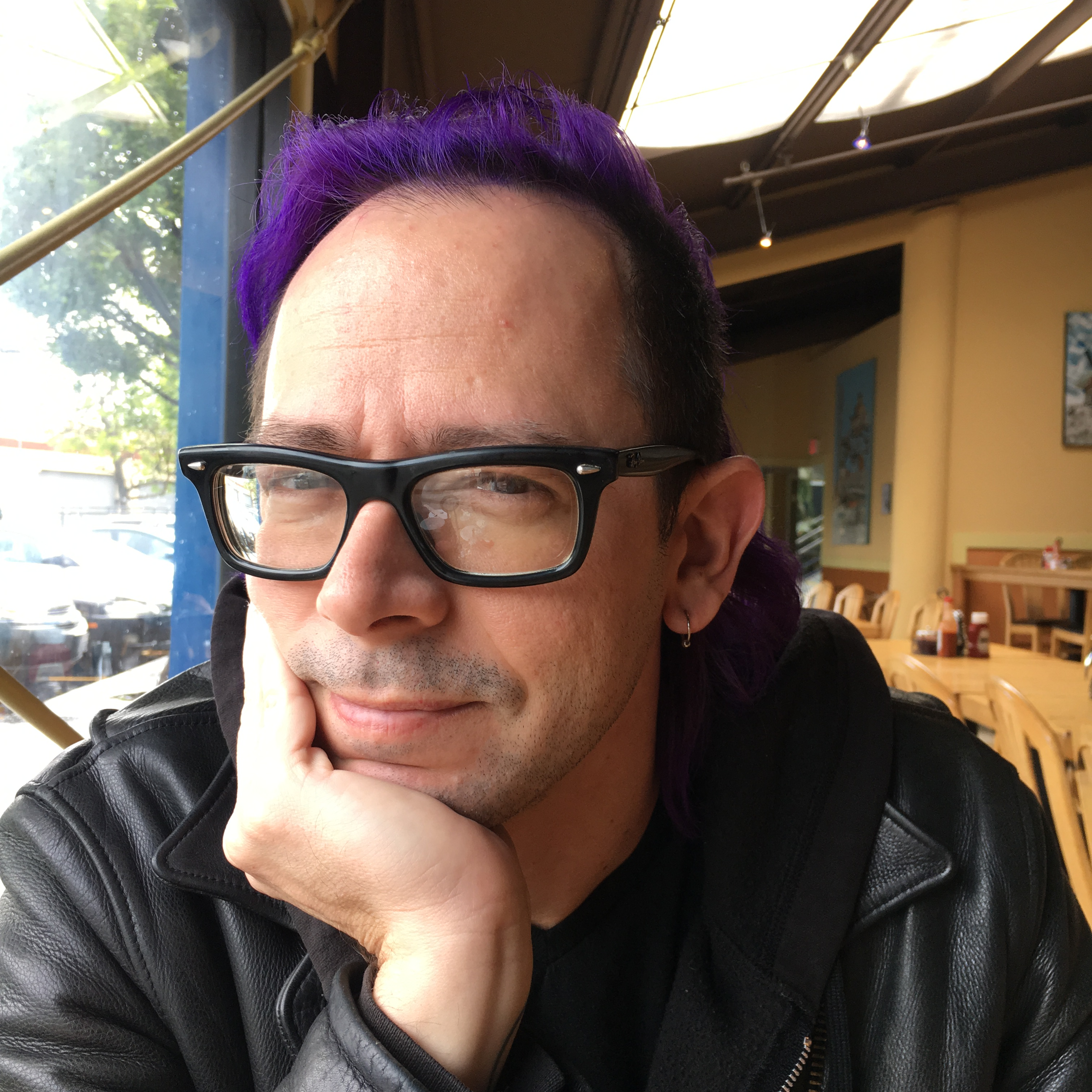
Garrett in 2016

Jesse James Garrett is a User Experience Designer based in San Francisco, California and co-founder of the Adaptive Path strategy and design consulting firm. His diagram titled The Elements of User Experience launched his popularity in the web design community in early 2000, which was later published as a book. In a 2005 paper, Garrett coined the term Ajax to describe the asynchronous technology behind emerging services like Google Maps and Google Suggest, as well as the resulting user experience which made it possible to browse without interruption by eliminating the reloading of the whole page.

== Biography ==
Jesse James Garrett co-founded Adaptive Path, a user experience strategy and design firm in 2001, and co-founded the Information Architecture Institute. His essays have appeared in New Architect, Boxes and Arrows, and Digital Web Magazine. Jesse attended the University of Florida.

Garrett authored The Elements of User Experience, a conceptual model of user-centered design first published as a diagram in 2000 and later as a book in 2002. A second edition of the book was published in 2010. Although originally intended for use in web design, the Elements model has since been adopted in other fields such as software development and industrial design. He also created the first standardized notation for interaction design, known as the Visual Vocabulary.

Garrett's works include ia/recon, an essay on the evolution of the information architecture field, and The Nine Pillars of Successful Web Teams, a conceptual model similar to Elements for team structures and processes. In his most well known endeavour, Garrett coined the term Ajax in February 2005 to describe the information behind asynchronous Javascript and XML. Although he was not the only one working on the development of this technology, Garrett thought of the term in the shower when he realized the need for a shorthand term to represent the suite of technologies he was proposing to a client.

In 2008, Garrett designed the Aurora concept for a future Web browser for the Mozilla Corporation. Garrett's closing keynote at the 2009 Information Architecture Summit (IA Summit 2009), known as the "Memphis Plenary" created controversy and debate within the user experience community.

Garrett's project "iWitness" was one of the winners of the John S. and James L. Knight Foundation's 2011 Knight News Challenge media innovation competition.

== Awards ==
In May, 2006 Garrett was awarded Wired Magazine's Rave Award in the field of technology.

== Personal life ==
Garrett was born in Ottawa, Ontario, Canada, and grew up in Florida. He lived in Los Angeles for 5 years before moving to San Francisco in 1999. He was married to Rebecca Blood from 2001 - 2014 and they have one child together.

== Bibliography ==
- The Elements of User Experience
