= Christina Wodtke =

American product designer (born 1966)

- Born: October 22, 1966 (age 60)
- Education: Kansas City Art Institute
- Occupations: author, lecturer
- Known for: Founded Women Talk Design, Co-founded Information Architecture Institute, information architecture, OKR goal setting

Christina R. Wodtke (born October 22, 1966) is an American businesswoman and specialist in the area of design thinking, information architecture (IA) and Management Science, specializing in objectives and key results (OKR) and team productivity. She is a lecturer at Stanford University.

== Career ==
Wodtke has held a series of executive roles in the tech industry, most notably leading teams who built the events platform and created an algorithm for Linkedin's newsfeed, leading a redesign of Myspace and its profile pages and leading the design and launch of the Zynga.com gaming platform.

Wodtke is a co-founder and past president of the Information Architecture Institute. As a User Experience professional, she has worked for such companies as Yahoo, Hot Studio, The New York Times, and Zynga to improve and develop their Web sites.

Wodtke founded an online journal for information architects Boxes and Arrows, which was nominated for a Webby Award in 2003.

Her first book Information Architecture: Blueprints for the Web (2003) was reviewed as a concise guide for IA beginners which does not necessarily offer new information for people experienced with IA. Instead of emphasizing rigid rules, the book provides practical exercises and scenarios to introduce readers to IA concepts such as archetypal personas, controlled vocabularies, sitepath diagrams, and user-centered design. In her book Radical Focus (2016), she first takes the reader through a fictional case study in the form of a fable and later explains how to use OKRs to help teams realize their goals.

== Bibliography ==
- Wodtke, Christina (2003). Information Architecture: Blueprints for the Web (1st ed.). Indianapolis, IN: New Riders. ISBN 0-7357-1250-6.
- Wodtke, Christina; Govella, Austin (2009). Information Architecture: Blueprints for the Web (2nd ed.). Berkeley, CA: New Riders. ISBN 978-0-321-60080-6.
- Wodtke, Christina (2016). Radical Focus: Achieving Your Most Important Goals with Objectives and Key Results. Palo Alto, CA: Cucina Media. ISBN 978-0996006026.
- Wodtke, Christina (2016). Introduction to OKRs. O'Reilly Media, Inc.
- Wodtke, Christina. Pencil Me In: The Business Drawing Book for People Who Can't Draw. Palo Alto, CA: Cucina Media. ISBN 978-0996006033.
- Wodtke, Christina (2019). The team that managed itself: a story of leadership. Palo Alto, CA: Cucina Media. ISBN 978-0996006071.
