= Bruno Vallespir =

Bruno Vallespir (born 1960) is a French engineer, and Professor of Enterprise Modelling at the University of Bordeaux, working in the fields of production management, performance evaluation and enterprise modeling.

== Biography ==
Vallespir received his PhD in at the University of Bordeaux with the thesis, entitled "Exploitation des systèmes de production discrets-continus: contribution à une méthode de conception."

Vallespir started his academic career at the University of Bordeaux, where in 2004 he was appointed Professor of Enterprise Modelling as successor of Guy Doumeingts. He is member of several IFIP working groups, including the WG 5.7 workgroup on Integrated Production Management. He has participated in the INTEROP NoE and the development of the Model Driven Interoperability (MDI) Framework.

== Selected publications ==
Vallespir published several books and articles in his field of expertise.:

- Bruno Vallespir (1987) Exploitation des systèmes de production discrets-continus: contribution à une méthode de conception.
- Bruno Vallespir, Guy Doumeingts, and Gerard Morel eds. Enterprise Interoperability: New Challenges and Approaches. Springer, 2007.
- Bruno Vallespir, Thècle Alix. eds. Advances in Production Management Systems: New Challenges, New Approaches: International IFIP WG 5.7 Conference, APMS 2009, Bordeaux, France, September 21–23, 2009, Revised Selected Papers. Springer Science & Business Media, 15 okt. 2010

Articles, a selection:

- Doumeingts, G., Vallespir, B., Darricau, D., & Roboam, M. (1987). "Design methodology for advanced manufacturing systems." Computers in Industry, 9(4), 271–296.
- Theodore J. Williams, Peter Bernus, J. Brosvic, David Chen, Guy Doumeingts, Laszlo Nemes, James L. Nevins, Bruno Vallespir, Jakob Vlietstra, D. Zoetekouw: "Architectures for Integrating Manufacturing Activities and Enterprises." Towards World Class Manufacturing, 1993: 181-194
- Doumeingts, Guy, Bruno Vallespir, and David Chen. "Methodologies for designing CIM systems: A survey." Computers in Industry 25.3 (1995): 263–280.
- Chen, David, Bruno Vallespir, and Guy Doumeingts. "GRAI integrated methodology and its mapping onto generic enterprise reference architecture and methodology." Computers in industry 33.2 (1997): 387–394.
- Doumeingts, Guy, Bruno Vallespir, and David Chen. "GRAI grid decisional modelling." Handbook on architectures of information systems. Springer Berlin Heidelberg, 1998. 313–337.
- Gregory Zacharewicz, David Chen, Bruno Vallespir. HLA Supported, Federation Oriented Enterprise Interoperability. Ejub Kajan. Electronic Business Interoperability: Concepts, Opportunities and Challenges, IGI Global, pp. 539–569, 2011.
