= Peter Bernus =

Hungarian-Australian computer scientist

Peter Bernus (born 1949) is a Hungarian Australian scientist and Associate Professor of Enterprise Architecture at the School of Information and Communication Technology, Griffith University, Brisbane, Australia.

== Biography ==
Peter Bernus graduated from Budapest Technical University as an engineer in electronic technology in 1976. He started working at the Mechanical Engineering Automation Division Computer and Automation Institute of the Hungarian Academy of Sciences. In 1990 he became a research officer at the Computer Science Department of the University of Queensland in Australia. He is currently an associate professor at Griffith University teaching in the Masters of Enterprise Architecture program.

Since 1976 he worked internationally on various aspects of enterprise integration as researcher, consultant and project leader for Industry, Government and Defense. In 2000–2003 Bernus was the Australian leader of the Enterprise Engineering work package of the Globemen International consortium, working with over 20 companies, that include ERP vendors, shipbuilding and engineering companies, among others.

Bernus is the past chair of the IFAC/IFIP Task Force on Architectures for Enterprise Integration which developed GERAM, the Generalised Enterprise Reference Architecture and Methodology (ISO 15704:2000) and foundation chair of Working Group 5.12 on Enterprise Integration of the International Federation of Information Processing (IFIP), currently working on the harmonisation of EA Frameworks, systems engineering and software engineering standards.

Bernus is also series editor for Springer Verlag and Managing Editor of the "Handbook on Enterprise Architecture", and is member of the editorial boards of several international journals.

== Work ==
Peter Bernus' research interests are in Enterprise Modelling, Enterprise Integration and Architectures for Enterprise Integration. Special interests include inter- and intra-organisational management, global enterprise networks, and dynamic project enterprises. He also has special interest in computer-mediated communication between people and ways to achieve common understanding.

=== GERAM Enterprise Architecture Framework ===
Generalised Enterprise Reference Architecture and Methodology (GERAM) is developed in the 1990s by an IFAC/IFIP Task Force on Architectures for Enterprise Integration with Peter Bernus, James G. Nell and others. The IFAC/IFIP Task Force on Architectures for Enterprise Integration was established in 1990 and had studied enterprise-reference architectures ever since.

The development of GERAM started with the evaluation of the earlier enterprise-reference architectures and their associated methodologies, such as CIMOSA, GRAI/GIM and the Purdue Enterprise Reference Architecture (PERA). Further, requirements were established about the needs of industry for such aids to enterprise integration, which led to an overall definition of generalised architecture.

The result has been called GERAM, for "Generalized Enterprise-Reference Architecture and Methodology". The Task Force has shown that such an architecture is feasible and that several architectures presently available in the literature can already or potentially can fulfil such requirements.

=== Handbook on Enterprise Architecture ===
In the 2003 "Handbook on Enterprise Architecture" Bernus and others introduce the GERAM Framework, indicate how it relates to other existing frameworks, and describe "how to design the architecture for an enterprise by considering all life cycle aspects of Enterprise Entities, such as individual enterprises, enterprise networks, virtual enterprises, projects, and other complex systems including a mixture of automated and human processes." For this the book is divided into five parts.

1. Architecture Frameworks – Organising Enterprise Architecture Knowledge
2. Strategy Making and Business Planning
3. Defining the Requirements for Enterprise Change
4. Developing the Master Plan – Architectural Design of the Changed Enterprise
5. Case Studies

According to Martin et al (2004) "Bernus et al. [Bernus, 2003] give several thorough case studies (along with an extensive discussion of enterprise architecture issues). Whether the frameworks address manufacturing operations, process control, information systems, or government bureaucracy, the artifacts produced to describe the enterprise comprise a valuable asset requiring its own distinct management. Managing and gaining full value from that asset is the reason enterprise architecture frameworks are conceived, built, and used."

== Publications ==
Bernus has published over sixty refereed papers and book chapters, several edited books.

- Peter Bernus (1995). IFIP TC5 Working Conference on Models and Methodologies for Enterprise Integration (1995 : Queensland) Modelling and methodologies for enterprise integration : proceedings of the IFIP TC5 Working Conference on Models and Methodologies for Enterprise Integration, Queensland, Australia, November 1995. Edited with Laszlo Nemes.
- Peter Bernus, Laszlo Nemes and Theodore J. Williams (1996). Architectures for Enterprise Integration.
- Peter Bernus, Kai Mertins and Günter Schmidt eds. (1998). Handbook on architectures of information systems.
- Peter Bernus, Laszlo Nemes and Günter Schmidt eds. (2003). Handbook on enterprise architecture
- Peter Bernus and Mark S. Fox eds. (2005). Knowledge sharing in the integrated enterprise : interoperability strategies for the enterprise architect.
- Peter Bernus (2006). Handbook on architectures of information systems. Edited with Kai Mertins and Günter Schmidt.
- Peter Bernus, Guy Doumeingts, Mark S. Fox (2010). Enterprise Architecture, Integration and Interoperability
