= Kurt Kosanke =

Kurt Kosanke (born ca. 1945) is a German engineer, retired IBM manager, director of the AMICE Consortium and consultant, known for his work in the field of enterprise engineering, Enterprise integration and CIMOSA.

== Life and work ==
Kosanke obtained his Engineering degree from the Physikalisch Technische Lehranstalt in Lübeck, Germany, nowadays the Private Berufsfachschule PTL Wedel.

He started his career in research and development at IBM Deutschland in Böblingen working on the instrument development of optical printers and large-scale displays. In the 4 years at IBM USA, he worked on production control, material logistics, and back in Germany focussed on manufacturing research and simulation. In 1984, Kosanke started participating in the ESPRIT AMICE project as IBM Deutschland representative, focussing on enterprise modelling and CIM Open Systems Architecture.

After IBM retirement Kosanke kept working as independent consultant, directed the AMICE project of the AMICE Consortium, and became Director of the CIMOSA Association. Kosanke took part in the IFIP IFAC Task Force on Architectures for Enterprise Integration, and contributed to the development of GERAM.

== Publications ==
Kosanke has published numerous papers in the fields Enterprise engineering. Enterprise integration and CIMOSA since the late 1980s Books:

- 1997. Enterprise engineering and integration : building international consensus : proceedings of ICEIMT ʾ97, International Conference on Enterprise Integration and Modeling Technology, Torino, Italy, October 28–30, 1997. Edited with James G. Nell. Springer.
- 2002. Enterprise Inter- and Intra-Organizational Integration: Building International Consensus. Springer, 30 nov. 2002

Articles, a selection:

- 1995. "CIMOSA - Overview and status." Computers in Industry Vol 27. p. 101-109
- 1995. "The CIMOSA business modelling process". With Martin Zelm and François Vernadat in Computers in Industry. Vol 27. p. 123-142
- 1999. "CIMOSA: enterprise engineering and integration." With Martin Zelm and François Vernadat in Computers in industry Vol 40 (2). p. 83-97
- 2001. "A Modelling Language for User oriented Enterprise Modelling", With Martin Zelm in: MOSIM'01, Troyes, France
- 2006. "ISO Standards for Interoperability: a comparison." Interoperability of Enterprise Software and Applications. Springer London, p. 55-64.
