= François Vernadat =

French and Canadian computer scientist (born 1954)

François B. Vernadat
- Born: 1954 (age 71–72)
- Occupation: Computer scientist

François B. Vernadat (born 1954) is a French and Canadian computer scientist, who has contributed to Enterprise Modelling, Enterprise Integration and Networking over the last 40 years specialising in Enterprise Architectures, business process modelling, information systems design and analysis, systems integration and interoperability and systems analysis using Petri nets.

== Biography ==
F. Vernadat studied from 1973 until 1981 at the University of Clermont, France, where he received a master's degree in Electronics and Automatic Control and a PhD in 1981. He has been a research officer first at the National Research Council of Canada (NRCC), Ottawa, from 1981 until 1988, and then at Institut National de Recherche en Informatique et Automatique (INRIA), France, until Sept. 1995. From 1995 until 2001 he has been a professor at the University of Metz, France in automatic control and industrial engineering, the head of the Department on Automation and Industrial Engineering (AGIP), the head of the MACSI Project at INRIA, and the director of the Laboratory for Industrial Engineering and Mechanical Production (LGIPM). At the end of 2001, he joined the European Commission, DG Eurostat in Luxemburg, as an administrator in the IT Directorate and then moved to DG Informatics (DIGIT) until Jan 2008. Since then he has been head of the Information Systems unit of the European Court of Auditors, another European institution. He is currently an associate member of the LGIPM (Laboratory for Industrial Engineering, Production and Maintenance) of University of Lorraine, Metz, France.

He has served for many years as associate editor for several scientific journals including "Computers in Industry", "International Journal of Production Research", "Enterprise Information Systems", "International Journal of Industrial Information Integration", and "Computers & Industrial Engineering" as well as the advisory board of "International Journal of Computer Integrated Manufacturing". He has been on the scientific committee of several other journals.

== Work ==
F. Vernadat's research work has been dealing with enterprise architectures, enterprise engineering, enterprise modelling, enterprise integration, information systems design and analysis, CIM and various aspects of industrial engineering, such as facility layout, performance measurement and management, cost estimation, and competency modelling.

== Publications ==
He is the author of over 300 scientific papers in journals, conferences, and edited books. A selection:

- 1993. CIMOSA: Open System Architecture for CIM. Edited by ESPRIT Consortium AMICE, Springer-Verlag, Berlin.
- 1993. Practice of Petri Nets in Manufacturing. Authored with F. DiCesare, G. Harhalakis, J.M. Proth, M. Silva, Chapman & Hall, London.
- 1993. Advances in factories of the future, CIM, and robotics. Edited with Michel Costaftis, Elsevier, Amsterdam.
- 1995. Integrated Manufacturing Systems Engineering. Edited with Pierre Ladet, Chapman & Hall, London.
- 1996. Enterprise Modeling and Integration: Principles and Applications, Chapman & Hall, London.
- 1999. Information control in manufacturing 1998 : (INCOM '98) : advances in industrial engineering : a proceedings volume from the 9th IFAC Symposium, Nancy-Metz, France, 24–26 June 1998. Edited with G. Morel.
- 1999. Techniques de Modélisation en Entreprise : Applications aux processus opérationnels, Economica, Paris.

Articles, a selection:

- 1990. "CIM-OSA Part I: Total Enterprise Modelling and Function View", Authored with H. Jorysz. In: Int. J. Computer Integrated Manufacturing, 3(3), 144-156.
- 1990. "CIM-OSA Part II: Information View", Authored with H. Jorysz. In: Int. J. Computer Integrated Manufacturing, 3(3), 157-167.
- 1994. "Standards and Prenorms in Design, Manufacturing and Automation". In: Handbook of Design, Manufacturing and Automation, Edited by R.C. Dorf and A. Kusiak, Wiley Interscience, New-York, Chap. 49, pp. 993–1019.
- 1995. "The M*-OBJECT methodology for information system design in CIM environments", Authored with G. Berio, A. Di Leva and P. Giolito. In: IEEE Trans. on Systems, Man, and Cybernetics, SMC-25 (1), 68-85.
- 1995. "The CIMOSA business modelling process", Authored with M. Zelm and Kurt Kosanke. In: Computers in Industry, 27, 123-142.
- 1998, 2006. "The CIMOSA Languages". In: Handbook on Architectures of Information Systems, Edited by P. Bernus, K. Mertins and G. Schmidt, Springer-Verlag, Berlin, pp. 251–272.
- 1999. "Process and Data Nets: The Conceptual Model of the M*-OBJECT Methodology", Authored with G. Berio, A. Di Leva and P. Giolito. In: IEEE Trans. on Systems, Man, and Cybernetics, SMC-29 (1); Part B, 104-114.
- 1999. "New Developments in Enterprise Modelling Using CIMOSA", Authored with G. Berio. In: Computers in Industry, 40 (2-3), 99-114.
- 2002. "Enterprise Modeling and Integration (EMI): Current Status and Research Perspectives". In: Annual Reviews in Control, 26, 15-25.
- 2002. "UEML: towards a unified enterprise modelling language". In: Int. J. Production Research, 40 (17), 4309-4321.
- 2004. "Standards on Enterprise Integration and Engineering – A state of the art", Authored with D. Chen. In: International Journal of Computer Integrated Manufacturing, 17 (3), 235-253.
- 2005. "Internet-based Enterprise Architectures". In: The Practical Handbook of Internet Computing, Edited by M. P. Singh, Chapman & Hall/CRC Boca Raton, Chap. 22, pp. 22–1 - 22-23.
- 2006. "Analysis and modeling of individual competencies: toward better management of human resources", Authored with M. Harzallah and G. Berio. In: IEEE Trans. on Systems, Man, and Cybernetics, 36 (1), 187-207.
- 2006. "Industrial performance measurement: An approach based on the aggregation of unipolar or bipolar expressions", Authored with L. Berrah and G. Mauris. In: Int. J. on Production Research, 44 (18-19), 4145-4158.
- 2007. "Reengineering the Organization with a Service Orientation". In: Service Enterprise Integration: An Enterprise Engineering Perspective, Edited by Cheng Hsu, Springer Science, New-York, Chapt. 3, pp. 77–101.
- 2007. "Interoperable Enterprise Systems: Principles, Concepts, and Methods". In: Annual Reviews in Control, 31(1), 137-145.
- 2007. "Enterprise Integration and Networking: Issues, trends and vision", Authored with A. Molina, D. Chen, H. Panetto and L. Whitman. In: Studies in Informatics and Control, 16(4), 353-369.
- 2008. "Architectures for Enterprise Integration and Interoperability: Past, present and future", Authored with D. Chen and G. Doumeingts. In: Computers in Industry, 29(3), 647-659.
- 2009. "Enterprise Integration and Interoperability". In Springer Handbook of Automation, Edited by Prof. S.Y. Nof, Springer-Verlag, Berlin, Chap. 86, pp. 1529–1538.
- 2010. "Technical, semantic and organizational issues of Enterprise Interoperability and Networking". Annual Reviews in Control, 34(1), 139-144.
- 2012. "Towards a system-based model for overall performance evaluation in a supply chain context". Authored with L. Berrah. In The Open Industrial and Manufacturing Engineering Journal, 5.
- 2013. "VR-PMS: a new approach for performance measurement and management of industrial systems". Authored with L. Shah, A. Etienne and A. Siadat. In International Journal of Production Research, 51(23-24), 7420-7438.
- 2014. "Enterprise Modeling in the context of Enterprise Engineering: State of the art and outlook". In International Journal of Production Management and Engineering, 2(2), 57-73.
- 2016. "Enterprise Information Systems State of the Art: Past, Present and Future Trends". Authored with D. Romero. Special Issue on Perspectives for the Next Generation of Enterprise Information Systems (D. Romero and F. Vernadat, eds). In Computers in Industry, 79, 3-13.
- 2017 "Process-Oriented Risk Assessment Methodology for Manufacturing Process Evaluation". Authored with L. Shah, A. Etienne and A. Siadat. In International Journal of Production Research, 55(15), 4516-4529.
- 2020. "Enterprise Modelling: Research review and outlook". In Computers in Industry, 122.
- 2023. "Interoperability and Standards for Automation". In Springer Handbook of Automation, 2nd edition, Edited by Prof. S.Y. Nof, Springer-Verlag, Berlin. Chap. 33.
