= Guy Doumeingts =

Guy Doumeingts (born 1938) is a French engineer, Emeritus professor at the University of Bordeaux 1 and former Director of "Laboratoire d’Automatique, Productique Signal et Image" control theory, known for the development of the GRAI method and his contributions to the field of Enterprise modelling.

== Biography ==
Doumeingts received his MS at the University of Bordeaux 1, where in 1984 he also received his PhD in Control Theory with the thesis, entitled La Méthode GRAI.

Doumeingts spent his academic career at the University Bordeaux I, where he was appointed professor and initiated and directed the GRAI/LAP (Laboratory of Automation and Productics). He chaired the Technical Committee on Computer Application in Technology at the IFIP (International Federation for Information Processing), and was member of the Editorial Board of several journals.

In 2012 Doumeingts was elected General Manager of INTEROP-VLab (International Virtual Laboratory for Enterprise Interoperability), a network of scientists and organizations to further develop and promote Enterprise interoperability.

== Work ==
=== Enterprise Interoperability, 2007 ===
In the preface of Enterprise Interoperability, Doumeingts et al. explained the importance of Interoperability for the Small Medium Enterprises (SMEs):

Over the past 20 years, the business world has been changing significantly, and concepts of cross-enterprise collaboration have been promoted to the center of enterprise strategy. For some organizations, doing business globally has become critical to their survival; others discover new opportunities by focusing their business on a local setting. Not only large organizations set up cooperation agreements with other enterprises, but also SMEs are combining forces to compete jointly in the market. Nowadays, the competitiveness of an enterprise is largely determined by its ability to seamlessly interoperate with others.

And furthermore specifically about Interoperability in the context of enterprises:

Interoperability in the context of enterprises and enterprise applications can be defined as the ability of a system or a product to work seamlessly with other systems or products without requiring special effort from the customer or user. The possibility to interact and exchange information internally and with external organisations is a key issue in the enterprise sector. It is fundamental in order to produce goods and services quickly, at lower cost, while maintaining higher levels of quality and customisation. Interoperability is considered to be achieved if the interaction can, at least, take place at the three levels: data, applications and business enterprise through the architecture of the enterprise model and taking into account the semantics issues. It is not only a problem of software and IT technologies. It implies support of communication and transactions between different organisations that must be based on shared process models and business references.

== Selected publications ==
Doumeingts published several books and over 200 articles in the field of enterprise modelling. Books:

- Guy Doumeingts and William A. Carter. Advances in production management systems : production management systems in the eighties : proceedings of the IFIP WG 5.7 Working Conference on Advances in Production Management Systems, APMS "82", Bordeaux, France, 24–27 August 1982.
- Guy Doumeingts, Jimmie Browne, Marco Tomljanovich (1991) Computer applications in production and engineering.
- Guy Doumeingts, J. Browne (1997), Modelling Techniques for Business Process Re-engineering.
- Peter Bernus, Guy Doumeingts, Mark S. Fox (2010). Enterprise Architecture, Integration and Interoperability

Articles, a selection:

- Doumeingts, Guy, Bruno Vallespir, and David Chen. "Methodologies for designing CIM systems: A survey." Computers in Industry 25.3 (1995): 263-280.
- Doumeingts, Guy, Bruno Vallespir, and David Chen. "GRAI grid decisional modelling." Handbook on architectures of information systems. Springer Berlin Heidelberg, 1998. 313-337.
- Doumeingts, G., Ducq, Y., Vallespir, B., & Kleinhans, S. (2000). "Production management and enterprise modelling." Computers in Industry, 42(2), 245-263.
- Chen, David, and Guy Doumeingts. "European initiatives to develop interoperability of enterprise applications—basic concepts, framework and roadmap." Annual Reviews in Control 27.2 (2003): 153-162.
- Chen, David, Guy Doumeingts, and François Vernadat. "Architectures for enterprise integration and interoperability: Past, present and future." Computers in industry 59.7 (2008): 647-659.
- Gregory Zacharewicz, Saikou Y. Diallo, Yves Ducq, Carlos Agostinho, Ricardo Jardim-Gonçalves, Hassan Bazoun, Zhongjie Wang, Guy Doumeingts: Model-based approaches for interoperability of next generation enterprise information systems: state of the art and future challenges. Inf. Syst. E-Business Management 15(2): 229-256 (2017).
