= Administrative domain =

An administrative domain is a service provider holding a security repository permitting to easily authenticate and authorize clients with credentials. This particularly applies to computer network security.

This concept is captured by the 'AdminDomain' class of the GLUE information model.

An administrative domain is mainly used in intranet environments.

== Implementation ==
It may be implemented as a collection of hosts and routers, and the interconnecting network(s), managed by a single administrative authority.

Interoperation between different administrative domains having different security repositories, different security software or different security policies is notoriously difficult. Therefore, administrative domains wishing ad hoc interoperation or full interoperability have to build a federation.
