= GRAI =

GRAI can refer to

- Global Returnable Asset Identifier
- GRAI method
