= Enterprise interoperability =

Enterprise interoperability is the ability of an enterprise—a company or other large organization—to functionally link activities, such as product design, supply chains, manufacturing, in an efficient and competitive way.

The research in interoperability of enterprise practised in is various domains itself (enterprise modelling, ontologies, information systems, architectures and platforms) which it is a question of positioning.

== Enterprise interoperability topics ==
=== Interoperability in enterprise architecture ===
Enterprise architecture (EA) presents a high level design of enterprise capabilities that defines successful IT projects in coherence with enterprise principles and business related requirements. EA covers mainly (i) the business capabilities analysis and validation; (ii) the development of business, application, data and technical architectures and solutions, and finally (iii) the control of programme and project implementation and governance. The application of EA methodology feeds the enterprise repository reference frame with sets of building blocks used to compose the targeted system.

The interoperability can be considered either as a principle, requirement or constraint that impact the definition of patterns to compose building blocks in the definition of targeted architectural roadmap. In this scope, EA within the TOGAF perspective, aims to reconcile interoperability requirements with potential solutions that make developed systems interoperable. So as to maintain the interoperability challenge quite present in the next steps of system's lifecycle, several models and Frameworks are developed under the topic enterprise interoperability.

=== Enterprise interoperability frameworks ===
To preserve interoperability, several enterprise interoperability frameworks can be identified in the literature:

- 2003: IDEAS: Interoperability Developments for Enterprise Application and Software.
- 2004: EIF: The European Interoperability Framework
- 2004: e-GIF: e-Government Interoperability Framework
- 2006: FEI: The Framework for Enterprise Interoperability
- 2006: C4IF: Connection, Communication, Consolidation, Collaboration Interoperability Framework
- 2007: AIF: Athena Interoperability Framework
- 2007: Enterprise Architecture Framework for Agile and Interoperable Virtual Enterprises

The majority of these frameworks considers enterprise at several aspects, viewpoints or abstraction levels: business, process, knowledge, application, technology, data, technic, etc. and proposes guidelines to support modeling and connection capabilities between these levels. The semantic challenge is considered as transversal to all these abstraction levels. Setting up and applying guidelines and methodologies developed within these frameworks requires modeling efforts that identify and connect artifacts.

=== Interoperability in software engineering ===
The evolution of IT technologies aims to outsource IT capabilities to vendors to manage for use on demand. The evolution pathway starts form packaged solutions and goes through Infrastructure as a service (Iaas), Platform as a service (Paas), Software as a service (Saas) and recently the Cloud. Interoperability efforts are still mainly expected among these levels:

- strategy to business
- business to processes
- processes to application

Dealing with business process definition, alignment, collaboration and interoperability, several international standards propose methodologies and guidelines in these perspectives:

- ISO 15704—Requirements for enterprise-reference architectures and methodologies
- CEN-ISO DIS 19439—Framework for Enterprise Modeling
- CEN-ISO WD 19440—Constructs for Enterprise Modeling
- ISO 18629—Process specification language
- ISO/IEC 15414—ODP Reference Model—Enterprise Language

In addition, recent standards (BPMN, BPEL, etc.) and their implementation technologies propose relevant integration capabilities. Furthermore, model driven-engineering provides capabilities that connect, transform and refine models to support interoperability.

=== Metrics for interoperability maturity assessment ===
The following approaches propose some metrics to assess the interoperability maturity,

- LISI: Levels of Information Systems Interoperability
- OIM: Organizational Interoperability Model
- NMI: NC3TA reference Model for Interoperability
- LCIM: Levels of Conceptual Interoperability Model
- EIMM: Enterprise Interoperability Maturity Model
- Smart Grid Interoperability Maturity Model Rating System

For the several interoperability aspects identified previously, the listed maturity approaches define interoperability categories (or dimensions) and propose qualitative as well as qualitative cross cutting issues to assess them. While interoperability aspects are not covered by a single maturity approach, some propositions go deeply in the definition of metric dimensions at one interoperability aspect such as the business interoperability measurement proposed by Aneesh.

== See also ==
- INTEROP-VLab
