= Interior Business Center =

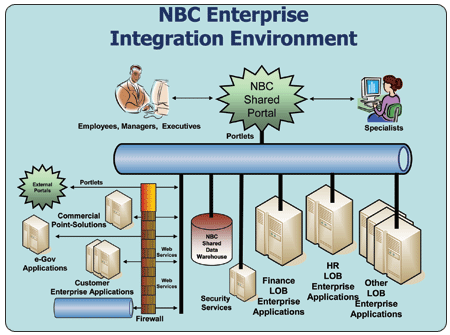
US National Business Center's Human Resources Line of Business, Innovative Future Direction, example of Enterprise integration.

The National Business Center (NBC) has been restructured and renamed. Effective October 1, 2012, it is renamed the Interior Business Center (IBC). NBC is an IT service provider of the United States Department of the Interior. It was created in 2000 by the consolidation of three existing services centers within the Department of the Interior, and has continued to grow. It also provides IT services to other government departments.

The center supports more than 150 government agencies, including the Offices and Bureaus within the Department and federal agencies outside the Department, as a Shared Service Center, providing business management systems and services. It is currently the only federal agency designated by both OMB and OPM as a Center of Excellence in financial management and human resources.

On August 23, 2005, the Office of Personnel Management (OPM) issued a press release announcing the National Business Center (NBC) as one of five Federal Human Resources (HR) Shared Service Centers (SSC). Now that the NBC has been chosen by the OPM to continue as an HR Line of Business (LoB) SSC, the NBC's function is to offer not only the NBC's HR and payroll solutions,> but the full range of HR functions envisioned by the OPM.
