= Gregory Zacharewicz =

Polish academic (born 1977)

Gregory Zacharewicz is Full Professor at École des mines d'Alès (National Institute of Mining and Telecommunications) in Alès, France. He recently joined the LGI2P laboratory in 2018 to develop research based on simulation. He was previously Associate Professor at the University of Bordeaux (2007-2018), where he conducted research on modeling, interoperability and simulation of business and social organization. He worked with Bruno Vallespir and Guy Doumeingts and under the direction of Claudia Frydman and Norbert Giambiasi.

== Research ==
His research focuses more generally on distributed discrete event modeling, ERP, BPMN and workflow.

He recently co-authored "Model-based Approaches to the Interoperability of Next Generation Enterprise Information Systems: State of the Art and Future Challenges"

In the field of methodologies and health technologies, in 2018 he co-wrote with Bernard P. Zeigler, Mamadou K. Traoré and Raphaël Duboz the book "Value-based learning systems: integrative modeling and simulation".

He was program chair of the Springsim 2017 at Pasadena, general chair of SpringSim 2018 in Baltimore. He is a member of the editorial board of Sage Simulation Journal, JSimE and SNE journals.

He led for IMS Lab the DIAMANTR project "Research on Advanced Technologies and Industries" (2015-2019) for IMS, the French National FUI SIMID project "Integrated and Distributed Information System for Maintenance, Repair and Operation" (MRO) "(2010-2014) and the RAPID project DGA SICOMORES "Constructive modeling and simulation of the effects of influence operations on social networks" (2013-2016).

== Publications ==
His most cited publications are:

- Agostinho C, Ducq Y, Zacharewicz G, Sarraipa J, Lampathaki F, Poler R, Jardim-Goncalves R. Towards a sustainable interoperability in networked enterprise information systems: trends of knowledge and model-driven technology. Computers in industry. 2016 Jun 1;79:64-76. According to Google Scholar, this article has been cited 93 times
- Zacharewicz G, Frydman C, Giambiasi N. G-DEVS/HLA environment for distributed simulations of workflows. Simulation. 2008 May;84(5):197-213. According to Google Scholar, this article has been cited 72 times
