= James G. Nell =

American engineer (born 1938)

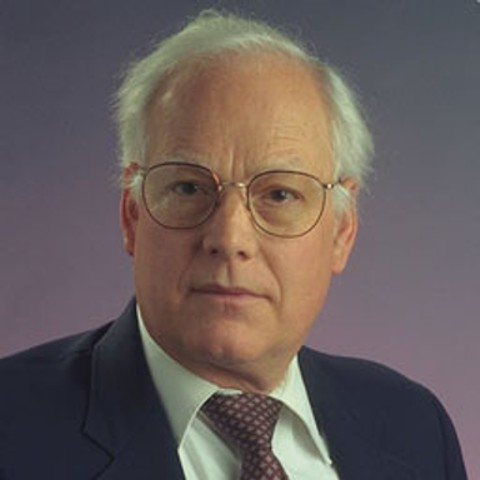
Jim Nell, National Institute of Standards and Technology, 2000

James G. "Jim" Nell (born 1938) is an American engineer. He was the principal investigator of the Manufacturing Enterprise Integration Project at the National Institute of Standards and Technology (NIST), and is known for his work on enterprise integration.

== Biography ==
Nell received his Bachelor of Science in Electrical Engineering (BSEE) from Drexel University and his MBA from Bowling Green State University.

From 1961 until 1993 Nell worked at Westinghouse Electric Company in various assignments in systems engineering, international marketing, program management, and strategic planning and finally Manager of Information Technology Programs at the Manufacturing Systems and Technology Center of Westinghouse Electric Corporation in Columbia, Maryland. From 1993 to 2000 at NIST he was the principal investigator of the Manufacturing Enterprise Integration Project.

Formerly he was active in the TC 184 SC4 work to develop product- and process-data representation, serving as the US expert to the SC4 Strategic Planning Advisory Group. For the IGES/PDES Organization, he was Chairman of the Steering Committee. He was the original chair of the Evolving Standards Focus Group of the Agile Manufacturing Enterprise Forum at the Iacocca Institute, and a founding participant of the ANSI Organization for Harmonization of Product Data Standards. As a member of the National Initiative for Product Data Exchange staff, he was the architect of the NIPDE Electronic Library, an early application of the World-Wide Web.

== Work ==
Nell has concentrated on product-information representation, enterprise integration, and standards that apply to information representation and enterprise integration.

=== GERAM ===
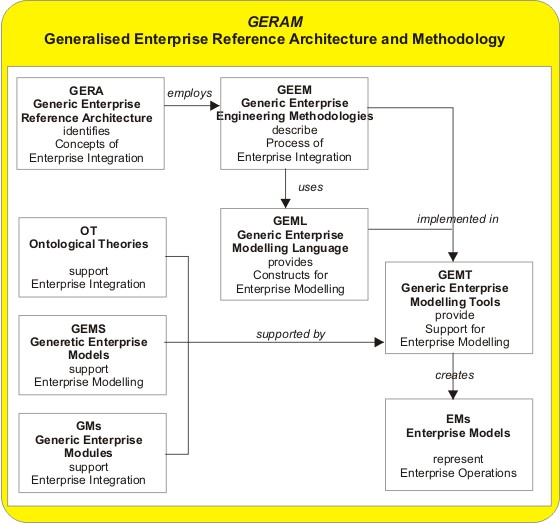
GERAM Framework overview

Generalised Enterprise Reference Architecture and Methodology (GERAM) is a generalised enterprise architecture framework for enterprise integration and business process engineering. It identifies the set of components recommended for use in enterprise engineering.

This framework was developed in the 1990s by an IFAC/IFIP Task Force on Architectures for Enterprise Integration. Starting from the evaluation of existing enterprise integration architectures, the Task Force has developed an overall definition of a generalised architecture. This proposed framework was labelled as GERAM for "Generalised Enterprise Reference Architecture and Methodology".

=== ISO TC184 SC5 WG1 ===
Jim Nell has been Convener of ISO TC184 SC5 WG1, Industrial Automation Systems and Integration, Architecture, Communications, and Integration Frameworks, Modeling and Architecture. He is a member of the US delegation to SC5, and a member of the US technical-advisory groups to TC184 and SC5.

=== Enterprise integration ===
Enterprise integration has been discussed since the early days of computers in industry and especially in the manufacturing industry, with computer-integrated manufacturing (CIM) as the acronym for operations integration. In spite of the different understandings of the scope of integration in CIM, it has always stood for information integration across at least parts of the enterprise. Information integration essentially consists of providing the right information, at the right place, at the right time.

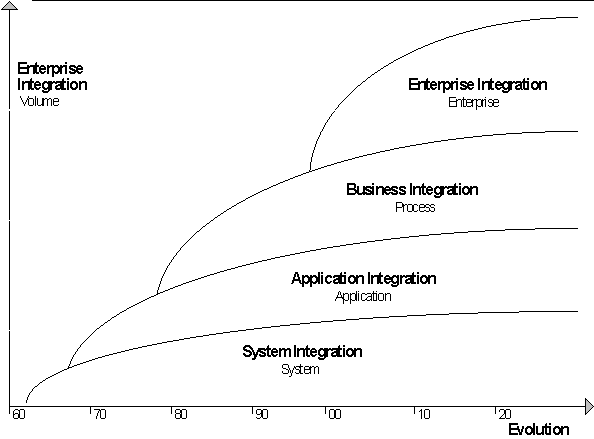
Evolution in enterprise integration

The state of the art in enterprise engineering and integration in the 1990s according to Nell and Kosanke (1997) has been rather confusing.

- On one hand it claims to provide solutions for many of the issues identified in enterprise integration.
- On the other hand, the solutions seem to compete with each other, use conflicting terminology and do not provide any clues on their relations to solutions on other issues.

Workflow modelling, business-process modelling, business-process re-engineering (BPR), and concurrent engineering all aim toward identifying and providing the information needed in the enterprise operation. In addition, numerous integrating-platforms concepts are promoted with only marginal or no recognition or support of information identification. Tools claiming to support enterprise modelling exist in very large numbers, but the support is rather marginal, especially if models are to be used by the end user, for instance, in decision support.

The understanding and application of enterprise-engineering and enterprise-integration technologies especially in the end-user community is hampered by the current confusion in solutions and terminology as well as by the lack of sufficient enterprise-integration technologies and their insufficient business justification. The need for enterprise-engineering and enterprise-integration technology is intensifying through the increasing emphasis on agile operation in globally extended or virtual enterprises.

=== Manufacturing Enterprise Integration ===
At NIST Jim Nell was the principal investigator of Manufacturing Enterprise Integration Project. This project aimed to improve business process interoperability by developing standards to allow software applications to share information better.

== Publications ==
Nell has published several scientific and professional papers since the 1990s as well as edited multiple books.

Books:

- 1997. Enterprise engineering and integration : building international consensus : proceedings of ICEIMT ʾ97, International Conference on Enterprise Integration and Modeling Technology, Torino, Italy, October 28–30, 1997. Edited with Kurt Kosanke. Springer.
- 2002. Enterprise Inter- and Intra-Organizational Integration: Building International Consensus (IFIP International Federation for Information Processing). Edited with Kurt Kosanke, Roland Jochem, and Angel Ortiz Bas

Articles, a selection:

- 1995. ""Enterprise Representation: An Analysis of Standards Issues" in: Modelling and Methodologies for Enterprise Integration, IFIP — The International Federation for Information Processing 1996, p. 56-68
- 1997. "A Standardization Strategy that Matches Enterprise Operation" in: Enterprise Engineering and Integration. Research Reports Esprit 1997, p. 54-63
- 1999. "Standards Road Map Project". With Neil Christopher. NIST paper at mel.nist.gov.
- 1999. "Standardisation in ISO for enterprise engineering and integration" with K. Kosanke; in: Computers in Industry (40) 2-3, p. 311-319
