= Integrated enterprise modeling =

Enterprise modeling method

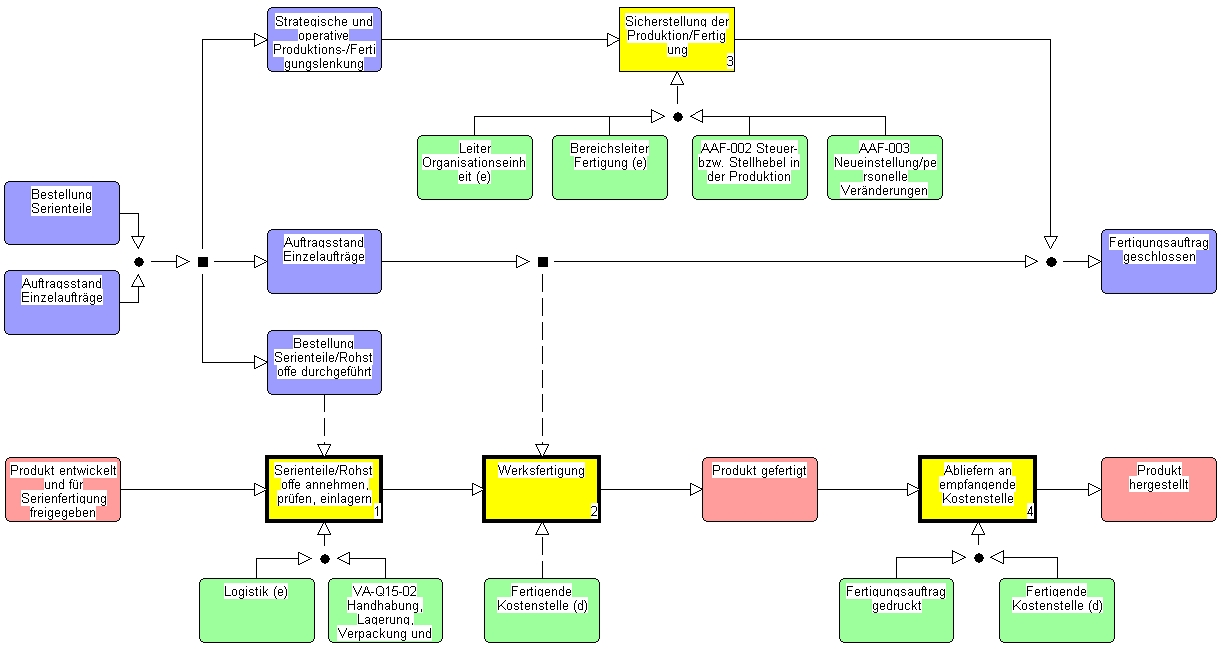
Model example

Integrated enterprise modeling (IEM) is an enterprise modeling method used for the admission and for the reengineering of processes both in producing enterprises and in the public area and service providers. In integrated enterprise modeling different aspects as functions and data become described in one model. Furthermore, the method supports analyses of business processes independently of the available organizational structure.

The Integrated Enterprise Modeling is developed at the Fraunhofer Institute for Production Systems and Design Technology (German: IPK) Berlin, Germany.

== Integrated enterprise modeling topics ==
=== Base constructs ===
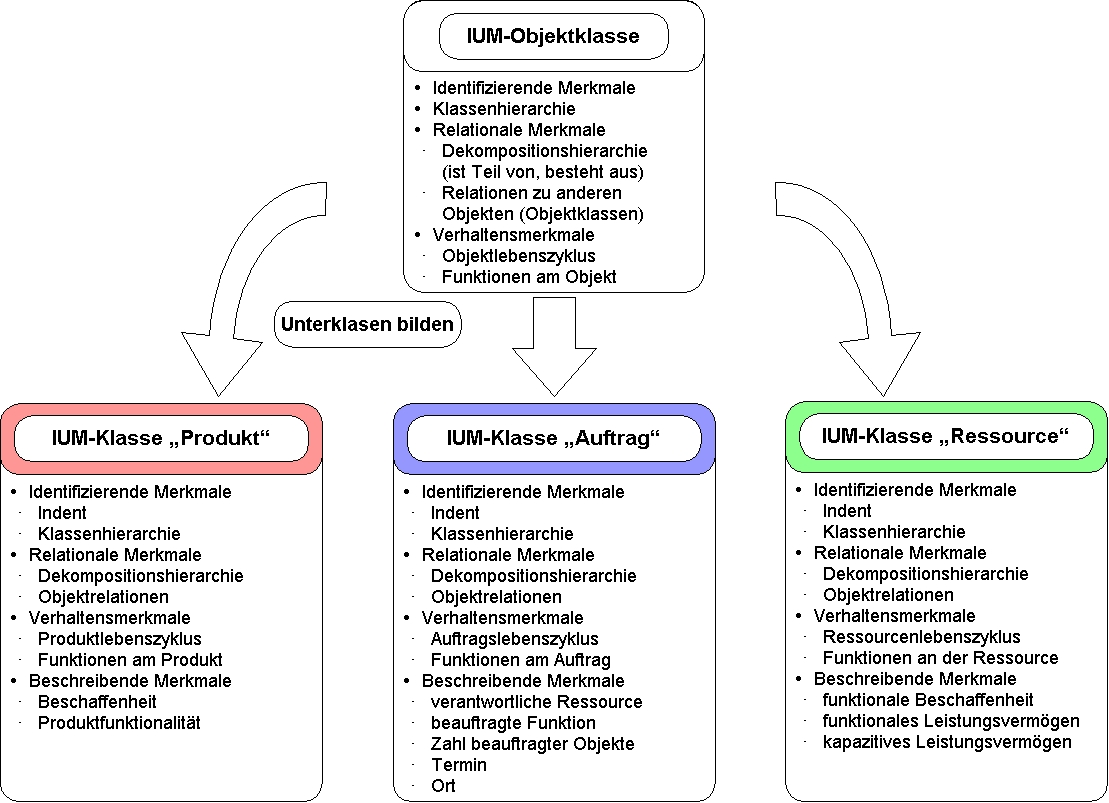
Generic object classes of the IEM

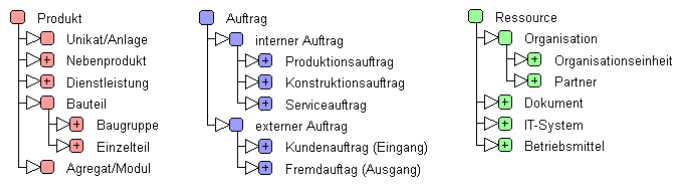
Overview of the object classes product, order and resource

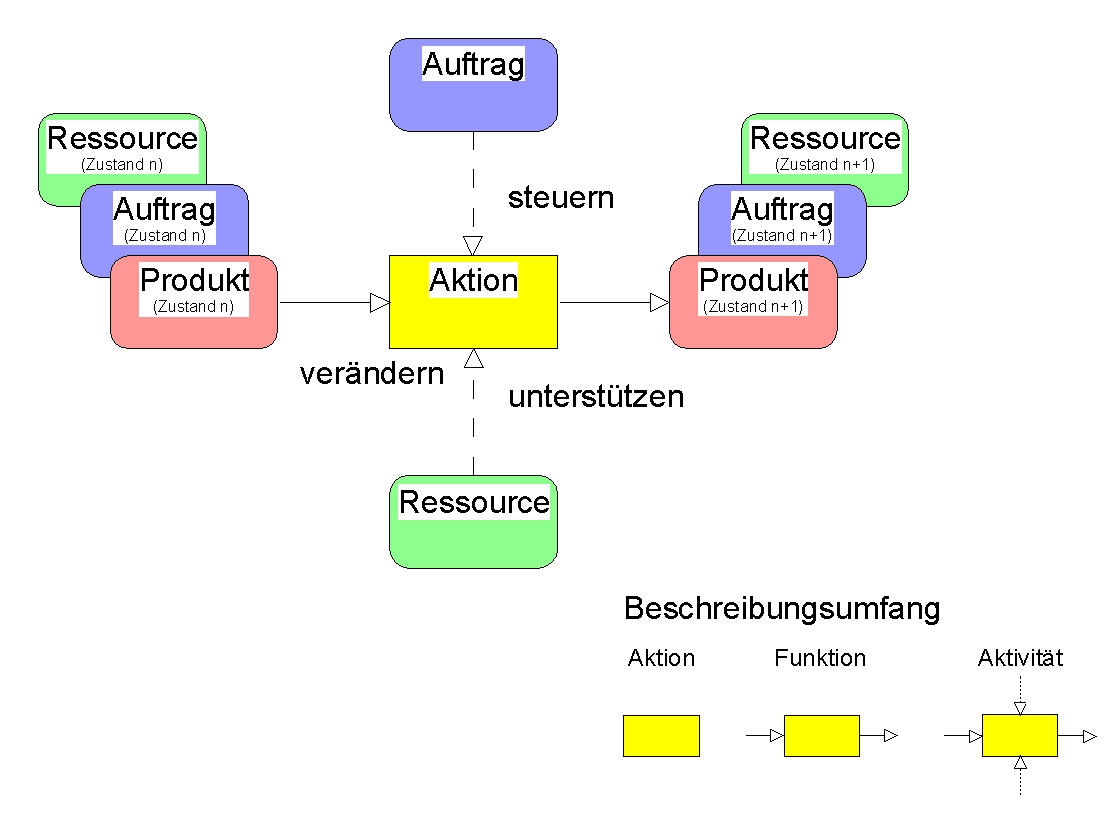
Generic activity model

The integrated enterprise modeling (IEM) method uses an object-oriented approach and adapts this for the enterprise description. An application-oriented division of all elements of an enterprise forms the core of the method in generic object classes "product", "resource" and "order".

Product

The object class "product" represents all objects whose production and sale are the aim of the looked-at-enterprise as well as all objects which flow into the end product. Raw materials, intermediate products, components and end products, as well as services and the describing data, are included.

Order

The object class "order" describes all types of commissioning in the enterprise. The objects of the class "order" represent the information that is relevant from the point of view of planning, control, and supervision of the enterprise processes. One understands by it what, when, at which objects, in whose responsibility and with which resources it will be executed.

Resource

The IEM class "resource" contains all necessary key players which are required in the enterprise for the execution or support of activities. Among other things, these are employees, business partner, all kinds of documents as well as information systems or operating supplies.

The classes "product", "order", and "resource" can gradually be given full particulars and specified. Through this it is possible to show both line of business typical and enterprise-specific product, order and resource subclasses. Structures (e.g. parts lists or organisation charts) can be shown as relational features of the classes with the help of being-part-of- and consists-of-relations between different subclasses.

Action

The activities which are necessary for the production of products and to the provision of services can be described as follows: an activity is the purposeful change of objects. The aim orientation of the activities causes an explicit or implicit planning and control. The execution of the activities is incumbent by the capable key players. From these considerations the definitions can be derived for the following constructs:

- An action is an object neutral description of activities: a verbal description of a work task, a lawsuit or proceeding;
- A function describes the change of state of a defined status into another defined one of objects of a class by using an action; and
- An activity specifies necessary resources for the state transformation of objects of a class the controlling order described by a function and these for the execution of this transformation in the enterprise, in each case represented by an object state description.

=== Views ===
All modeled data of the looked-at-enterprise are recorded in the model core of an Integrated Enterprise Modeling (IEM) model in two main views:

- the "information model"; and
- the "business process model".

All relevant objects of an enterprise, their qualities and relations are shown in the "information model". It is class trees of the object classes "product", "order" and "resource" here. The "business process model" represents enterprise processes and their relations to each other. Activities are shown in their interaction with the objects.

=== Process modeling ===
The structuring of the enterprise processes in Integrated Enterprise Modeling (IEM) is reached by its hierarchical subdivision with the help of the decomposition. Decomposition means the reduction of a system in a partial system which respectively contains components which are in a logical cohesion. The process modeling is a partitioning of processes into its threads. Every thread describes a task completed into itself. The decomposition of single processes can be carried out long enough until the threads are manageable, i.e. appropriately small. They may turn out also not too rudimentary because a high number of detailed processes increases the complexity of a business process model. A process modeling person, therefore, has to find a balance between the effort complexity degree of the model and possible detailed description of the enterprise processes. A model depth generally recommends itself with at most three to four decomposition levels (model levels).

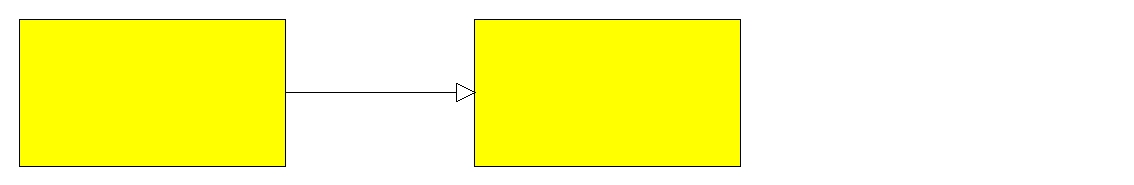
Sequential order

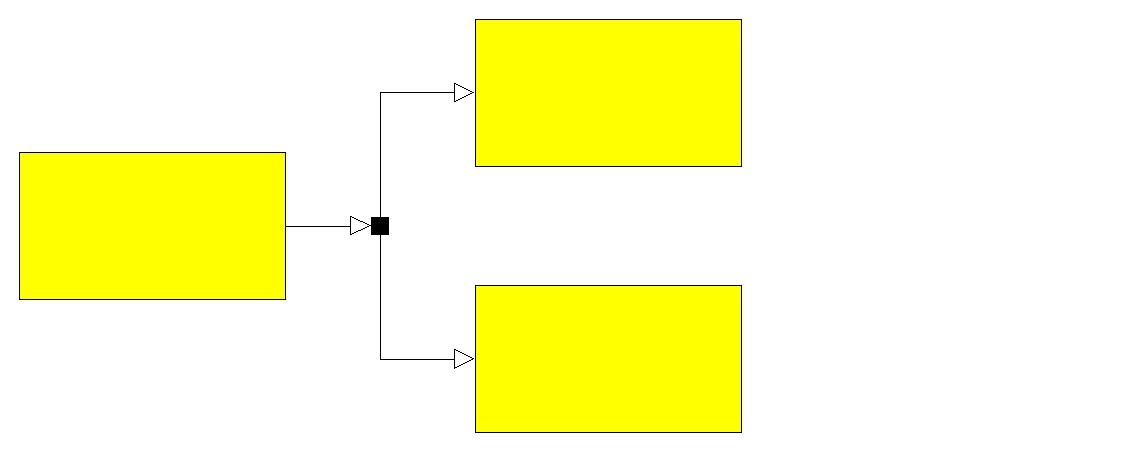
Parallel branching

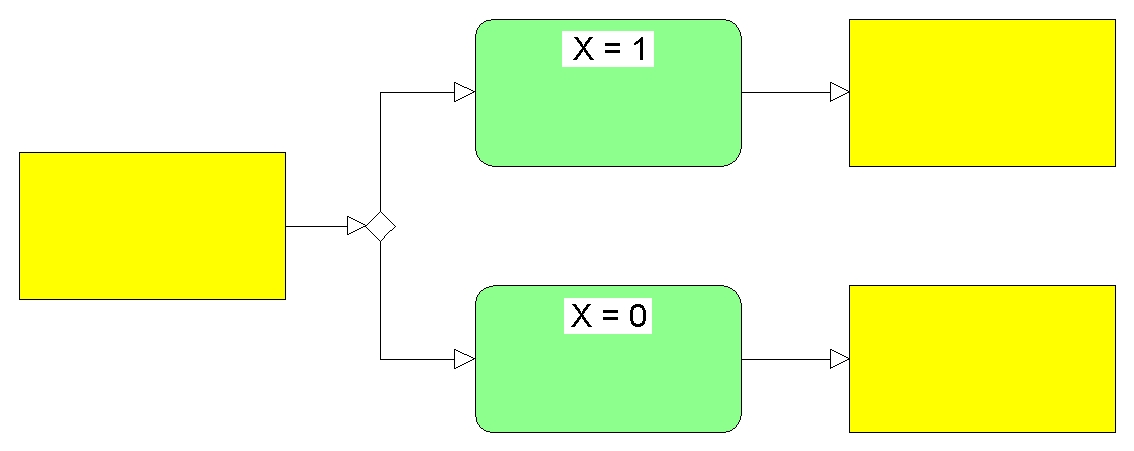
Case distinction

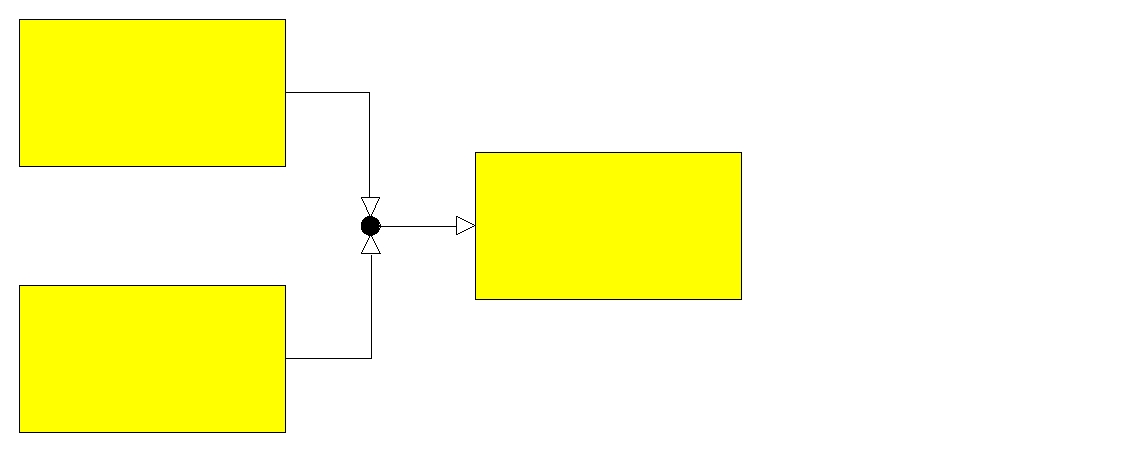
Uniting

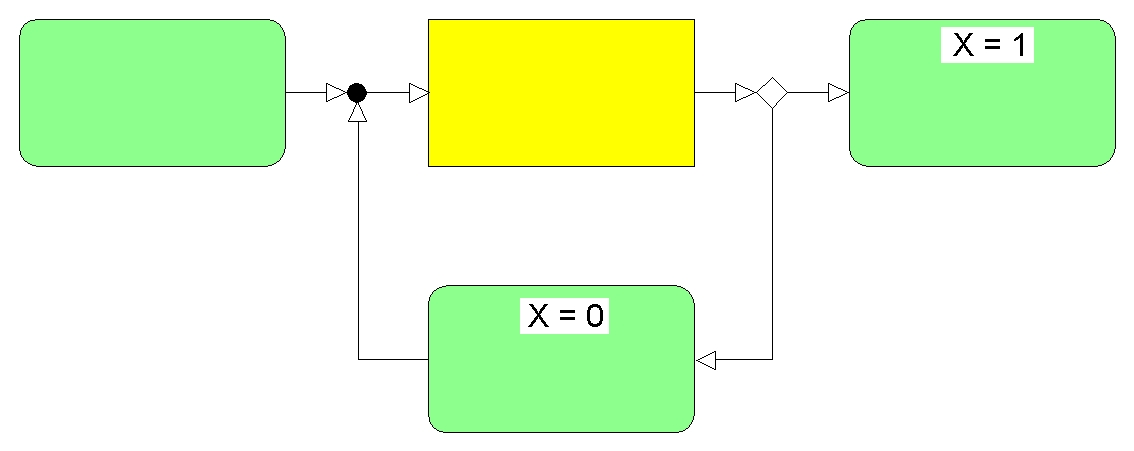

On a model level business process flows are represented with the aid of illustrated combination elements. There are these five basic types of combinations between the activities:

- Sequential order: At a sequential order the activities are executed after each other.
- Parallel branching: A parallel branching means that all parallel branched activities to be executed have to be completed before the following activity can be started with. It is not necessary that the parallel activities are executed at the same time. They can be deferred, too.
- Case distinction: Decision either or. The case distinction is a branching in alternative processes depending on definition of the subsequent conditions.
- Uniting: The end of a parallel as the case may be alternative execution or also an integration of process chains is indicated by the uniting.
- Loop: A repatriation (loop, cycle) is represented by means of case distinction and uniting. The activities included in the loop are executed as long as the condition for the continuation is given.

=== Modeling proceeding ===
The modeling procedure for the illustration of business processes in IEM covers the following steps:

- System delimitation;
- Modeling;
- Model evaluation and use; and
- Model change.

The system delimitation is the base of an efficient modeling. Starting out from a conceptual formulation the area of the real system to be shown is selected and interfaces will be defined to an environment. In addition, the detail depth of the model is also determined, i.e. the depth of the hierarchical decomposition relations in the view "business process model".

The delimited real system is convicted with help of the IEM method in an abstract model. IEM is the construction of the two main positions "information model" and "business process model". The "information model" is made by the specification of the object classes to be modeled for "product", "order" and "resource" with the class structures as well as descriptive and relational features. By identification and description of functions, activities and its combination to processes the "business process model" is formed. As a general rule the construction of the "information model" follows first in which the modeling person can go back to available reference class structures. The reference classes which do not correspond to the real system or were not found to be relevant at the system delimitation are deleted. The missing relevant classes are inserted. After the object base is fixed, the activities and functions are joined at the objects according to the "generic activity model" and with the help of combination elements to business processes. A model is made which can be analysed and changed if it is required. It often happens, that during the construction of the "business process model" new relevant object classes are identified so that the class trees getting completed. The construction of the two positions is, therefore, an iterative process.

Afterward, weak points and improvement potentials can be identified in the course of the model evaluation. This can cause the model changes whose realization should clear the weak points and make use of the improvement potentials in the real system.

=== Modeling tool MO²GO ===
The software tool MO²GO (method for an object-oriented business process optimization) supports the modeling process based on the integrated enterprise modeling (IEM). Different analyses of a given model are available like the planning and implementation of information systems. The MO²GO system is expandable easily and makes a high-speed modeling approach possible.

The currently used MO²GO system consists of the following components:

- MO²GO version 2.4: This component offers modeling functions for class structures, process chains and mechanism for analysis of IEM.
- MO²GO Macro editor version 2.1: The macro editor supports the outline of MO²GO macros for user-defined evaluation procedures.
- MO²GO Viewer version 1.07: The Java-based and licence-free MO²GO Viewer is a user interface to be used easily to navigate process chains through MO²GO.
- MO²GO XML converter version 1.0: Nowadays the IT implementation works mainly with UML diagrams. MO²GO supports a component for a model based XML file which can be imported in UML tools.
- MO²GO Web publisher version 2.0: The web Publisher is a mechanism of analysis to be started directly out of MO²GO 2.4. A process assistant is the result of the evaluation of the model contents based on texture and hyperlink representation. To be able to adapt the process assistant to the user requirements flexibly, the web Publisher contains a configuration component.

=== MO²GO process assistant ===
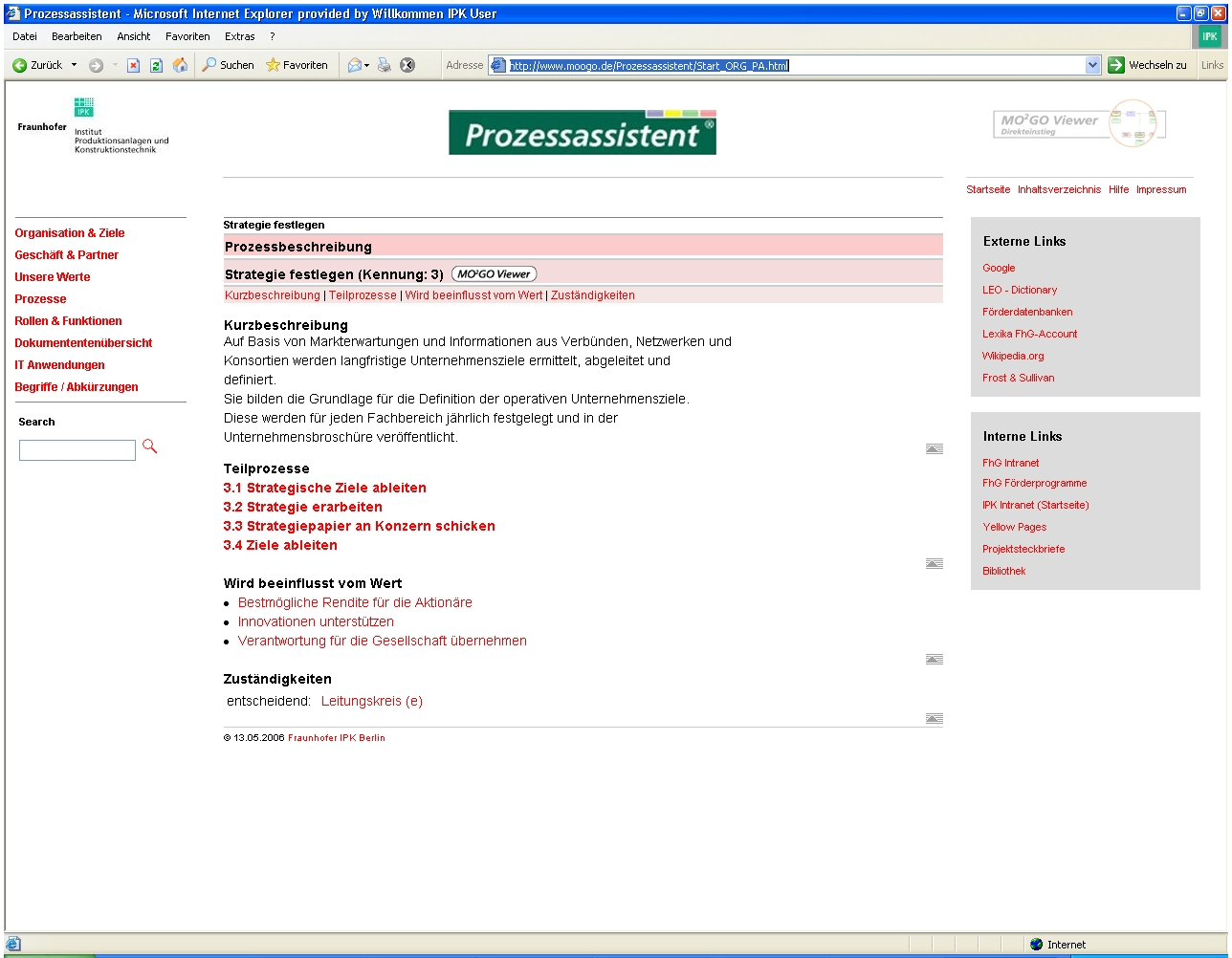
Prozess assistant

The IEM business process models contain much information that can not only be used by system analysts but also be helpful for the employees at their daily work. To provide this model information for the staff and to enable the participation of the employees for the results of the modeling, a special tool was developed at the Fraunhofer IPK. This is a web-based process assistant whose contents are generated automatically from the IEM business process model of the enterprise. The process assistant provides all users the information of the business process model in an HTML-based form by intranet of the enterprise. For its implementation, no special methods or tool knowledge is required besides the basic EDP and Internet experiences.

The process assistant has been developed so that the employees can find answers to the questions fast and precisely: e.g.

- What are the processes in the enterprise?
- In which way are they structured as?
- Who and with which responsibility is involved in the certain process?
- Which documents and application systems are used?

Or also:

- A certain organisation unit is involved at which processes?
- Or in which processes a certain document or an application system is used?

To make an informative process assistant from the business process model, certain modeling rules must be followed. The means e.g. that the individual actions must be deposited with its descriptions, the responsibility of the organisation units must be indicated explicitly or the paths also must be entered to the documents in the class tree. The fulfilment of these conditions means an additional time expenditure at the modeling, if these conditions are met, all employees are able to "surf" online through the intranet with the help of the process assistant by an informative enterprise documentation. They have the possibility between a graphic view and a texture-based description according to their preferences and methodical previous knowledge. The graphic view is provided by the MO²GO Viewer, a viewer tool for MO²GO models. The process assistant and the MO²GO Viewer are connected so that the graphic representation of the process looked at can be accessed context sensitively from the process assistant.

Users can call on all templates, specifications and documents for the working sequence both from the process assistant and from the MO²GO Viewer online. Therefore, the process assistant cannot only be employed for the tracing of the modeling results but also in the daily business for the training of new employees as well as execution of process steps. To improve the usability in the daily routine, the process assistant can be adapted to the needs of the users' flexibility. This customization can be carried out both concerning the layout and concerning the main content emphases of the process assistant.

== Areas of application of the IEM ==
Knowledge is used in organisations as a resource to render services for customers. The service preparation performs along actions which are described as processes or business processes. The analysis and improvement in dealing with knowledge presupposes a common idea about this context. An explicit description of the processes, therefore, is required because they represent the context for the respective knowledge contents. The process modeling represents a powerful instrument for the design and a conversion of a process-oriented knowledge management. In the context of the method of the business process-oriented knowledge management (GPO KM) developed at the Fraunhofer IPK the method of the "integrated enterprise modeling" (IEM) is accessed. It makes it possible to be able to show, to describe, to analyse and to form organisational processes. The IEM features few object classes, is ascertainable easily understandable and fast. Furthermore, the object orientation of the IEM opens up the possibility of showing knowledge as an object class. For the knowledge-oriented modeling of the business processes according to the IEM method the relevant knowledge contents have to be specified after knowledge domains and know-how bearers and represented as resources in the business process model.

In further applications, IEM is used to create models across organisations (e.g. companies) to archive a common understanding between the involved stakeholders and derive services (create software and define the ASP). In this context the object-oriented basis of IEM has been used to create a common semantic across the single company models and to archive compliant enterprise models (predefined classes – terminology, model templates, etc.). The reason is that the terminology used within a model has to be understandable independent of the modeling language, see also SDDEM.

== See also ==
- Business process modeling
