= INTEROP-VLab =

The INTEROP V-Lab (International Virtual Laboratory for Enterprise Interoperability) is a network of organizations, which links scientists, research centers, representatives of industry, and small and medium-sized enterprises. The members come from several European countries and represent 250 scientists and 70 organizations.

INTEROP-VLab was founded in 2007 and is the continuation of the INTEROP Network of Excellence (Interoperability research for networked enterprise applications and software), a research initiative of the European Union founded early 2000s, which developed the Model Driven Interoperability (MDI) Framework.

In 2012 Guy Doumeingts was appointed general manager of INTEROP-VLab.

== Overview ==
INTEROP-VLab is an initiative that is working within the context of interoperability, in particular the so-called Enterprise Interoperability (EI). It aims to link together in a network researchers and research institutions and industry representatives, engaged in developing approaches and integrative solutions to connect heterogeneous industrial systems, public administrations or organizations.

The basic objective of INTEROP-VLab is the defragmentation of the European research and scientific landscape and support the cooperation of other regions of the world:

- through support of research, teaching and innovation in the field of Enterprise Interoperability
- through the work of a center of excellence in the field of Enterprise Interoperability world

== Activities ==
The activities of INTEROP-VLab consist of research, teaching and training services and standardization consultancy.

The independent research within INTEROP-VLabs is based on the following three key components:

- Information and communication technology as a technological foundation of interoperable systems
- Modeling of processes, organizations and organizational units to develop and implement appropriate structures for interoperable companies and public organizations
- The development and specification of ontologies to ensure semantic consistency within organizations affiliated with the following priorities:
  - Theoretical groundwork
  - Investigation and development of key technologies
  - Development of exemplary applications

Within INTEROP-VLab developed solutions include:

- IV kmap (INTEROP-VLab Knowledge Map ), a competence management system within the EI range that is based on an ontology-based search engine and allows to find relevant documents and content relating to a particular knowledge domain.
- The IV e-learning platform, with 50 web-courses and seminars in the field of EI, modeling, ontologies offers and Architecture & Platforms

== Members ==
The members of the INTEROP-VLab are organize in poles of geographic regions within a State or group of States. Activities of each organization are coordinated at European level. The members of the INTEROP-VLab are:

- INTEROP-VLab poles France Grand Sud-Ouest (PGSO)
- DFI (German Forum for interoperability eV)
- INTEROP-VLab UK Pole
- INTEROP-VLab China Pole
- INTEROP-VLab INTERVAL Pole
- INTEROP-VLab Portuguese poles (INTEROP-ptrp)
- INTEROP-VLab.IT
- INTEROP North Pole
