= Integrated manufacturing database =

Means to incorporate IT in the manufacturing process

An integrated database system can be used by small and large businesses as a means to incorporate IT in the manufacturing process. It updates, stores and records information, with a view to rapid retrieval.

Some examples of could include:

- Design technology (performing updates of concept ideas)
- Specifications for component parts (including quality control information, test results and manufacturing process plans).

It is capable of performing searches for a particular part that may be present in many different products.
