= Interoperation =

In engineering, interoperation is the setup of ad hoc components and methods to make two or more systems work together as a combined system with some partial functionality during a certain time, possibly requiring human supervision to perform necessary adjustments and corrections.

This contrasts to interoperability, which theoretically permits any number of systems compliant to a given standard to work together a long time smoothly and unattended as a combined system with the full functionality by the standard.

Another definition of interoperation: "services effectively combining multiple resources and domains...; requires interoperability".

== Usage ==
Interoperation is usually performed when the systems having to be combined were designed before standardization (for example legacy systems), or when standard compliance is too expensive, too difficult, or immature.

Interoperation may use following mechanisms, components and methods:

- Connectors
- Adapters
- Converters
- Simulators
- Bridges

In the area of data processing, interoperation may also use following components and methods:

- Handlers
- Plug-ins
- Translators
