= CIMOSA =

Enterprise modeling framework

CIMOSA cube: The basics of the reference architecture from which a particular architecture is developed.

CIMOSA, standing for "Computer Integrated Manufacturing Open System Architecture", is an enterprise modeling framework, which aims to support the enterprise integration of machines, computers and people. The framework is based on the system life cycle concept, and offers a modelling language, methodology and supporting technology to support these goals.

It was developed in the 1990s by the AMICE Consortium, in an EU project. A non-profit organization CIMOSA Association was later established to keep ownership of the CIMOSA specification, to promote it and to support its further evolution.

== Overview ==
The original aim of CIMOSA (1992) was "to elaborate an open system architecture for CIM and to define a set of concepts and rules to facilitate the building of future CIM systems". One of the main ideas of CIMOSA is the categorization of manufacturing operations in:

- Generic functions: generic parts of every enterprise, independent of organisation structure or business area.
- Specific (partial and particular) functions: specific for individual enterprises.

The development of CIMOSA has ultimately resulted in two key items:

- Modeling Framework: This framework supports "all phases of the CIM system life-cycle from requirements definition, through design specification, implementation description and execution of the daily enterprise operation".
- Integrating Infrastructure: This infrastructure provides "specific information technology services for the execution of the Particular Implementation Model", which has proven to be vendor independent and portable.

The framework furthermore offers an "event-driven, process-based modeling approach with the goal to cover essential enterprise aspects in one integrated model. The main aspects are the functional, behavioral, resource, information and organizational aspect".

CIMOSA can be applied in process simulation and analysis. Standardized CIMOSA models "can also be used on line in the manufacturing enterprise for scheduling, dispatching, monitoring and providing process information". One of the standards based on CIMOSA is the Generalised Enterprise Reference Architecture and Methodology (GERAM).

== Building blocks ==
The main focus of CIMOSA has been to construct:

- a framework for enterprise modelling, a reference architecture
- an enterprise modelling language
- an integrating infrastructure for model enactment supported by
- a common terminology

A close liaison with European and international standardization organisations was established to stimulate the standardization process for enterprise integration.

CIMOSA aims at integrating enterprise operations by means of efficient information exchange within the enterprise. CIMOSA models enterprises using four perspectives:

- the function view describes the functional structure required to satisfy the objectives of an enterprise and related control structures;
- the information view describes the information required by each function;
- the resource view describes the resources and their relations to functional and control structures; and
- the organization view describes the responsibilities assigned to individuals for functional and control structures.

== AMICE Consortium ==
AMICE Consortium was a European organization of major companies concerned with computer-integrated manufacturing (CIM). It was initiated in 1985 and dissolved in 1995, and eventually included users, vendors, consulting companies, and academia. Among the participating companies were IBM, Hewlett-Packard, Digital Equipment Corporation (DEC), Siemens, Fiat, and Daimler-Benz.

The AMICE Consortium was initiated as European Strategic Program on Research in Information Technology (ESPRIT) project to bring together stakeholders in the development of CIM for the development of new standards for CIM systems. This led to the development of the CIMOSA, which defined "a comprehensive set of constructs sufficient to describe all aspects of manufacturing systems." It also established the CIMOSA Association.

=== Publications ===
The AMICE Consortium has published several books and papers. A selection:

- 1989. Open System Architecture for CIM, Research Report of ESPRIT Project 688, Vol. 1, Springer-Verlag.
- 1991. Open System Architecture, CIMOSA, AD 1.0, Architecture Description, ESPRIT Consortium AMICE, Brussels, Belgium.
- 1992. ESPRIT Project 5288, Milestone M-2, AD2.0, 2, Architecture description, document RO443/1. Consortium AMICE, Brussels, Belgium.
- 1993. CIMOSA: open system architecture for CIM, Springer, 1993.

=== CIMOSA Association ===
At the start of the 1990s the CIMOSA Association (COA) was founded as a non-profit organisation by the AMICE Consortium, aiming to promote enterprise engineering and integration (EE&I) based on CIMOSA. It has extended its goals in the new millennium towards "upcoming new enterprise paradigms of extended, virtual and agile enterprises, which cause new requirements on organisational concepts and supporting technologies. Enhanced decision support and operation monitoring and control are some of the needs of today and tomorrow. Capturing knowledge and using it across organisational boundaries will be a major challenge in the new types of businesses. This real-time knowledge needed to support the establishment, deployment and discontinuation of the inter and intra organisational relations".

From the start CIMOSA has been an active supporter for national, European and international standardization of Enterprise Integration.

In 2010 the CIMOSA Association closed due "loss of membership according to people retirements."

== See also ==
- Architecture of Integrated Information Systems (ARIS)
- Computer Integrated Manufacturing
- Generalised Enterprise Reference Architecture and Methodology (GERAM)
- ISO 19439 Framework for enterprise modelling
