= GRAI method =

Modeling method of Enterprise modelling

The GRAI method, GRAI is short for Graphs with Results and Actions Inter-related, and the further developed GRAI Integrated Methodology (GIM) is a modeling method of Enterprise modelling.

The GRAI method was first proposed by Guy Doumeingts in his 1984 PhD thesis, entitled La Méthode GRAI, further developed at the GRAI/LAP (Laboratory of Automation and Productics) of University Bordeaux, and followed by GRAI/GIM by Doumeingts and others in 1992.

The GRAI method can represent and analyze the operation of all or part of a production activity. The strength of the GRAI method lies in its ability to provide modelers can effectively model the decision-making system of the company, i.e. organizational processes that generate decisions.

In the GRAI methodology four types of views had been incorporated: the functional view, physical view, decisional view and informational systems view.
