= Computer-integrated manufacturing =

Manufacturing controlled by computers

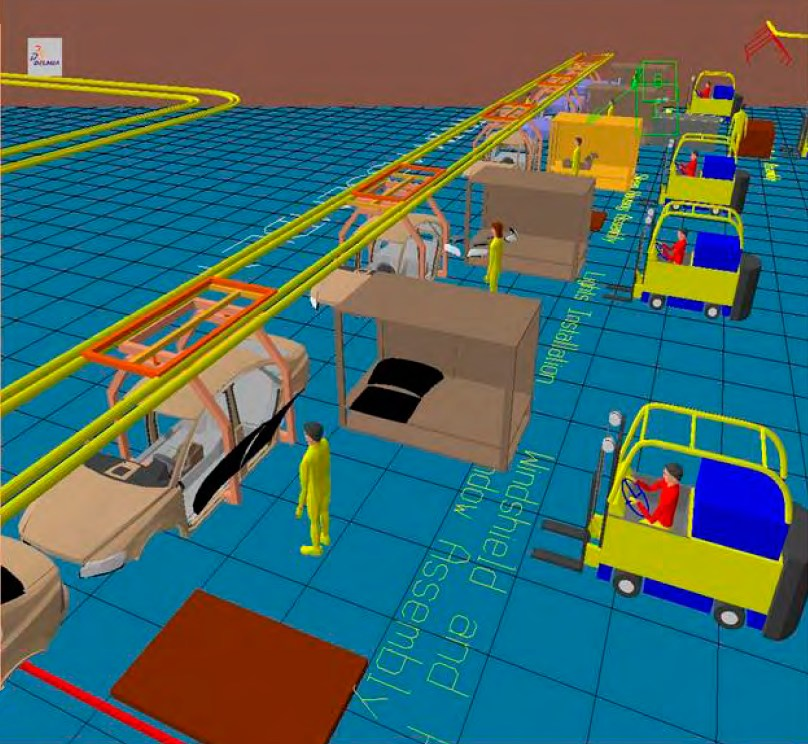
Manufacturing Systems Integration Program, NIST 2008

Computer-integrated manufacturing (CIM) is the manufacturing approach of using computers to control the entire production process. This integration allows individual processes to exchange information with each part. Manufacturing can be faster and less error-prone by the integration of computers. Typically CIM relies on closed-loop control processes based on real-time input from sensors. It is also known as flexible design and manufacturing.

== Overview ==
1. Computer-integrated manufacturing is used in automotive, aviation, space, and ship building industries.
2. The term "computer-integrated manufacturing" is both a method of manufacturing and the name of a computer-automated system in which individual engineering, production, marketing, and support functions of a manufacturing enterprise are organized.
3. In a CIM system functional areas such as design, analysis, planning, purchasing, cost accounting, inventory control, and distribution are linked through the computer with factory floor functions such as materials handling and management, providing direct control and monitoring of all the operation.

CIM is an example of the implementation of information and communication technologies (ICTs) in manufacturing.

CIM implies that there are at least two computers exchanging information, e.g. the controller of an arm robot and a micro-controller.

CIM is most useful where a high level of ICT is used in the company or facility, such as CAD/CAM systems, and the availability of process planning and its data.

== History ==
The idea of "digital manufacturing" became prominent in the early 1970s, with the release of Dr. Joseph Harrington's book, Computer Integrated Manufacturing. However, it was not until 1984 when computer-integrated manufacturing began to be developed and promoted by machine tool manufacturers and the Computer and Automated Systems Association and Society of Manufacturing Engineers (CASA/SME).

"CIM is the integration of total manufacturing enterprise by using integrated systems and data communication coupled with new managerial philosophies that improve organizational and personnel efficiency." ERHUM
In a literature research was shown that 37 different concepts of CIM were published, most of them from Germany and USA. In a timeline of the 37 publications it is possible to see how the CIM concept developed over time. Also it is quite markable how different the concepts of all publications are.

system.jpg|thumb|320px|CIM & production control system: Computer Integrated Manufacturing is used to describe the complete automation of a manufacturing plant, with all processes running under computer control and digital information tying them together.

=== Key challenges ===
There are three major challenges to development of a smoothly operating computer-integrated manufacturing system:

- Integration of components from different suppliers: When different machines, such as CNC, conveyors and robots, are using different communications protocols (In the case of AGVs, even differing lengths of time for charging the batteries) may cause problems.
- Data integrity: The higher the degree of automation, the more critical is the integrity of the data used to control the machines. While the CIM system saves on labor of operating the machines, it requires extra human labor in ensuring that there are proper safeguards for the data signals that are used to control the machines.
- Process control: Computers may be used to assist the human operators of the manufacturing facility, but there must always be a competent engineer on hand to handle circumstances which could not be foreseen by the designers of the control software.

=== Subsystems ===
A computer-integrated manufacturing system is not the same as a "lights-out factory", which would run completely independent of human intervention, although it is a big step in that direction. Part of the system involves flexible manufacturing, where the factory can be quickly modified to produce different products, or where the volume of products can be changed quickly with the aid of computers. Some or all of the following subsystems may be found in a CIM operation:

Computer-aided techniques:

- CAD (computer-aided design)
- CAE (computer-aided engineering)
- CAM (computer-aided manufacturing)
- CAPP (computer-aided process planning)
- CAQ (computer-aided quality assurance)
- PPC (production planning and control)
- ERP (enterprise resource planning)
- A business system integrated by a common database.

Devices and equipment required:

- CNC, Computer numerical controlled machine tools
- DNC, Direct numerical control machine tools
- PLCs, Programmable logic controllers
- Robotics
- Computers
- Software
- Controllers
- Networks
- Interfacing
- Monitoring equipment

Technologies:

- FMS, (flexible manufacturing system)
- ASRS, automated storage and retrieval system
- AGV, automated guided vehicle
- Robotics
- Automated conveyance systems

Others:

- Lean manufacturing

=== CIMOSA ===
CIMOSA (Computer Integrated Manufacturing Open System Architecture), is a 1990s European proposal for an open systems architecture for CIM developed by the AMICE Consortium as a series of ESPRIT projects. The goal of CIMOSA was "to help companies to manage change and integrate their facilities and operations to face worldwide competition. It provides a consistent architectural framework for both enterprise modeling and enterprise integration as required in CIM environments".

CIMOSA provides a solution for business integration with four types of products:

- The CIMOSA Enterprise Modeling Framework, which provides a reference architecture for enterprise architecture
- CIMOSA IIS, a standard for physical and application integration.
- CIMOSA Systems Life Cycle, is a life cycle model for CIM development and deployment.
- Inputs to standardization, basics for international standard development.

CIMOSA according to Vernadat (1996), coined the term business process and introduced the process-based approach for integrated enterprise modeling based on a cross-boundaries approach, which opposed to traditional function or activity-based approaches. With CIMOSA also the concept of an "Open System Architecture" (OSA) for CIM was introduced, which was designed to be vendor-independent, and constructed with standardised CIM modules. Here to the OSA is "described in terms of their function, information, resource, and organizational aspects. This should be design

== Areas ==
There are multiple areas of usage:

- In Industrial and Production engineering
- In mechanical engineering
- In electronic design automation (printed circuit board (PCB) and integrated circuit design data for manufacturing)

== See also ==
- Direct numerical control
- Enterprise integration
- Enterprise resource planning
- Flexible manufacturing system
- Integrated Computer-Aided Manufacturing
- Integrated manufacturing database
- Manufacturing process management
- Product lifecycle management
