= Brenner (surname) =

Brenner is a surname.

== People ==
=== A–J ===
- Adam Brenner, better known under his stage name Adam Bomb (born 1963), American musician
- Al Brenner (1947–2012), American football player
- Albert Brenner (1926–2022), American production designer
- Andrew Brenner (born 1971), American politician
- Anita Brenner (1905–1974), Mexican-American scholar and writer
- Anthony Brenner (born 1959), Canadian-born German ice hockey player
- Antonia Brenner (1926–2013), American nun
- Art Brenner (1924–2013), American painter
- Athalya Brenner (born 1943), Dutch biblical scholar
- Barbara Brenner (1951–2013), American breast cancer activist
- Benjamin Brenner (1903–1970), American lawyer and politician
- Bernhard Brenner (died 2017), German physiologist
- Bert Brenner (1887-1971), American baseball player
- Bror Brenner (1855–1923), Finnish sailor
- Carl Christian Brenner (1838–1888), German-American painter
- Ceri Brenner (born 1987), UK Physicist - Speaker & Laser specialist
- Charles Brenner (psychiatrist) (1913–2008), American psychoanalyst
- Charles Brenner (mathematician) (born 1945), American mathematician
- Charles Brenner (biochemist) (born 1961), American biologist
- Dan Brenner (born 1963), American songwriter
- Daniel Brenner, American rabbi
- David Brenner (1936–2014), American comedian and actor
- David Brenner (film editor) (1962–2022), American film editor
- David J. Brenner (born 1953), American biophysicist
- Donald Brenner (1945–2011), Canadian judge
- Donald W. Brenner, American scientist
- Dori Brenner (1946–2000), American actress
- Eduard Brenner (1888–1970), German linguist
- Elias Brenner (1647–1717), Finnish artist
- Engelbert Brenner (1904–1986), American oboist
- Ernst Brenner (1856-1911), Swiss politician
- Erny Brenner (1931–2016), Luxembourgish footballer
- Eve Brenner (born 1925), American actress
- Ève Brenner (born 1941), French opera singer
- Ewald Brenner (born 1975), Austrian footballer
- Frédéric Brenner (born 1959), French photographer
- Fritz Brenner (1877–1969), German physician and pathologist
- Gabrielle A. Brenner, Canadian economist
- George Brenner (1913–1952), American cartoonist
- George Brenner (politician) (1929–2021), Australian politician
- Gerson Brenner (1959–2026), Brazilian actor and model
- Glenn Brenner (1948–1992), American sportscaster
- Guillaume Brenner (born 1986), Footballer
- Hannelore Brenner (born 1963), German Paralympic equestrian
- Hans Brenner (actor) (1938–1998), Austrian actor
- Hans Brenner (swimmer) (1912–1977), Swiss swimmer
- Hans-Dieter Brenner (born 1952), German banker
- Helmut Brenner (1957–2017), Austrian musicologist
- Hoby Brenner (born 1959), American football player
- Howard Brenner (1929–2014), American chemical engineering professor
- Irv Brenner (1913–1991), American basketball player
- J. S. Brenner (1911–1980), American politician
- Jacob Brenner (1857–1921), Jewish-American lawyer and judge
- Janis Brenner, American choreographer
- János Brenner (1931–1957), Hungarian Catholic priest and martyr
- Jean Brenner (1937–2009), French painter
- Jeffrey Brenner (born 1969), American physician
- Joel Lee Brenner (1912–1997), American mathematician
- Johanna Brenner (born 1943), American feminist and sociologist
- Johannes Brenner (1906–1975), Estonian footballer
- John Brenner (shot putter) (born 1961), American shot putter and discus thrower
- John Lewis Brenner (1832–1906), American politician
- John S. Brenner (born 1968), American politician
- John W. O. Brenner (1874–1962), American Lutheran minister
- Johnny Brenner (born 1971), Irish hurler
- Josef Brenner (1899–1967), German politician
- Joshua Ilika Brenner (born 1976), Mexican swimmer

=== K–Z ===
- Karl-Heinrich Brenner (1895–1954), German Waffen-SS general, SS-Gruppenführer and Generalleutnant of Polizei
- Kazimierz Brenner (1917–1944), Polish partizan, soldier of World War II
- Kehoma Brenner (born 1986), Germany international rugby union player
- Koloman Brenner (born 1968), Hungarian politician
- Lenni Brenner (born 1937), American Trotskyist writer
- Lisa Brenner (born 1974), American actress
- Ludwig von Brenner (1833–1902), German conductor and composer
- Malcolm Brenner, British doctor
- Malcolm Brenner (writer) (born 1951), American author, journalist, and zoophile
- Marco Brenner (born 2002), German cyclist
- Marie Brenner (born 1949), American journalist
- Marie Pauline Brenner (1906–1978), American religious educator
- Mark D. Brenner (born 1969), American writer and labor activist
- Matthias Brenner (born 1957), German actor, director and writer
- Maurice Brenner (1914–2005), American actor
- Mayor Brenner (1906–1973), Soviet pianist
- Menachem Brenner, American academic
- Michael Brenner (historian) (born 1964), German historian
- Michael P. Brenner, American mathematician and physicist
- Mike Brenner, American musician
- Neil Brenner (born 1969), American urban theorist
- Otto Brenner (1907–1972), German trade unionist and politician
- Paolo Brenner (born 1966), German cardiac surgeon
- Patrick M. Brenner, American policy analyst and nonprofit executive
- Peter Brenner (1937–2019), Swiss civil engineer and geologist
- Rachel Feldhay Brenner (1946–2021), American college professor
- Rafael Resnick Brenner (born 1960), Argentine lawyer, businessman and public official
- Ray Brenner (1898–1975), American football player
- Reeve Robert Brenner (born 1936), American rabbi
- Reuven Brenner (born 1947), Canadian economist
- Rich Brenner (1946–2012), American television sportscaster
- Robbie Brenner (born 2000), American media executive, head of Mattel Studios
- Robert Brenner (born 1943), American economic historian
- Rodolfo Brenner (1922–2018), Argentine biochemist
- Rose Brenner (1884–1926), American Jewish women's leader
- Sam Brenner (born 1990), American football player
- Sara Brenner, American preventive medicine physician
- Sophia Elisabet Brenner (1659–1730), Swedish writer, poet, feminist and salon hostess
- Stacy Brenner, American politician
- Stephen Brenner (born 1974), Irish hurler
- Steven E. Brenner, American biologist and academic
- Stig Brenner (born 1990), Norwegian rapper, singer, and songwriter from Hamar
- Summer Brenner (born 1945), U.S. female writer and activist
- Susanne Brenner (born 1958), American mathematician
- Sydney Brenner (1927–2019), South African biologist and Nobel prize winner
- Teddy Brenner (1918–2000), American boxing matchmaker and promoter
- Tyler Brenner (born 1988), Canadian ice hockey player
- Veronica Brenner (born 1974), Canadian freestyle skier
- Victor David Brenner (1871–1924), American sculptor, engraver, and medalist
- Vytas Brenner (1946–2004), Venezuelan musician
- Walter Brenner (chemical engineer) (1923–2017), Austrian academic
- Walter Brenner (computer scientist) (born 1958), Swiss computer scientist and academic
- Wendy Brenner, American writer
- Yosef Haim Brenner (1881–1921), Russian-born Hebrew-language author
- Zev Brenner, American radio host
- Zvi Brenner (1915–1999), Zionist leader

== Fictional characters ==
- Zeke Brenner, in the comic strip Doonesbury

== See also ==
- Brenner (disambiguation)
- Brener
- Brynner (disambiguation)
