= Hubert Österle =

Austrian academic

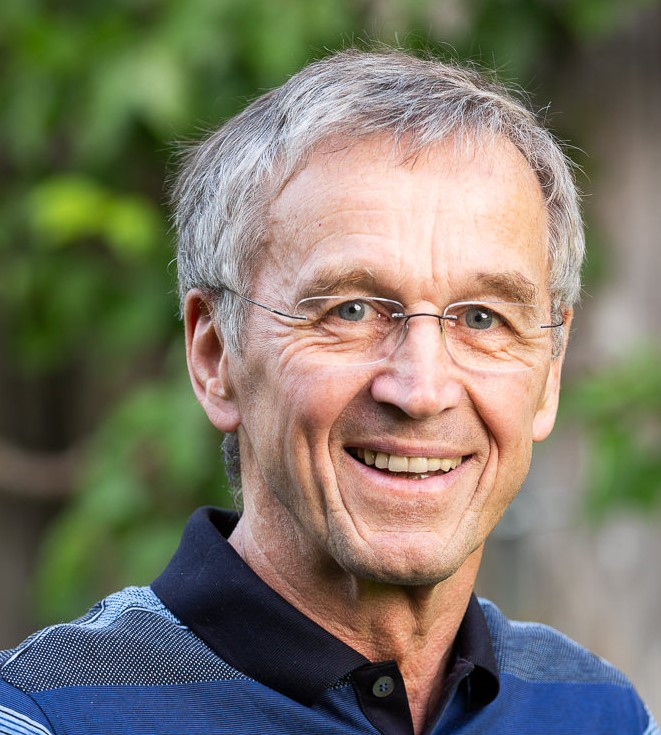
- (2019)
- Born: 24 June 1949 (age 75); Dornbirn, Austria
- Known for: Professor of business and information systems engineering

Hubert Österle (born 24 June 1949, Dornbirn) is an Austrian academic, and Professor Emeritus of Business and Information Systems, and former director of the Institute of Information Management at the University of St. Gallen.

== Career ==
Hubert Österle studied business administration at the University of Innsbruck and the Johannes Kepler Universität Linz. He obtained his PhD at the University of Erlangen-Nuremberg in 1973 with his dissertation “Computerunterstütztes Entscheidungstraining” (computer assisted decision training). After working as a consultant at IBM Germany, Österle completed his postdoctoral work (habilitation) on the "Design of information systems" at the Technical University of Dortmund in 1980.

In 1980 Österle became full professor of business and information systems engineering at the University of St. Gallen. In 1989, he founded the Institute of Information Management. In 1997 he initiated the executive MBA program "Business Engineering" at the University of St. Gallen. Österle was editor-in-chief of Electronic Markets and a member of the editorial boards of other journals. In March 2015 Österle received an honorary doctorate from the Wroclaw University of Economics.

Besides his academic achievements, Österle founded in 1989 the consultancy company "The Information Management Group" and the Business Engineering Institute St. Gallen AG in 2003. In addition, Österle is founder and president of the board of directors of the Amiona AG and a member of the supervisory board of the CDQ AG.

== Research areas ==
Research areas of Österle are business engineering, consumerization, independent living, sourcing in the financial industry, corporate data quality and life engineering.

== Selected publications ==
Books

- Life Engineering: Machine Intelligence and Quality of Life, Springer, Wiesbaden 2020.
- Corporate Data Quality: Prerequisite for Successful Business Models. (with Boris Otto), epubli, Berlin 2015.
- IT-Driven Business Models (with Henning Kagermann and John M. Jordan), Wiley, Hoboken/NJ 2010.
- Geschäftsmodelle 2010: Wie CEOs Unternehmen transformieren (with Henning Kagermann), FAZ, Frankfurt, 2006.
- Real-Time Business: Lösungen, Bausteine und Potentiale des Business Networking (with Rainer Alt), Springer, Berlin 2004.
- Customer Knowledge Management: Kundenwissen erfolgreich einsetzen (with Lutz M. Kolbe and Walter Brenner), Springer, Berlin 2003.
- Business Engineering: Auf dem Weg zum Unternehmen im Informationszeitalter. (with Robert Winter), Springer, Berlin 2000 (2nd edition, 2003).
- Business Networking: Shaping Collaboration between Enterprises (with Elgar Fleisch and Rainer Alt), Springer, Heidelberg 2000 (2nd edition, 2001).
- Customer Relationship Management in der Praxis. (with Volker Bach), Springer, Berlin 2000.
- Enabling Systematic Business Change: Integrated Methods and Software Tools for Business Process Redesign. (with Leo Brecht and Thomas Hess), Vieweg, Wiesbaden 1996.
- Business in the Information Age: Heading for new Processes. Springer, Heidelberg, 1995.
- Total Information Systems Management: A European Approach (with Walter Brenner and Konrad Hilbers), Wiley, Hoboken, New Jersey, 1994.
- Unternehmensführung und Informationssystem: Der Ansatz des St. Galler Informationssystem-Managements. (with Walter Brenner and Konrad Hilbers), Teubner, Stuttgart, 1991 (2nd edition, 1992).
- Entwurf betrieblicher Informationssysteme, Hanser, München 1980.

Selected articles

- Towards an electronic marketplace for bricks-and-mortar services (with Peter Schenkel and Philipp Osl), Acis 2013 Proceedings (2013)
- Toward a functional reference model for master data quality management (with Boris Otto and Kai Hüner), Information Systems and e-Business Management (2012)
- Product data quality in supply chains: the case of Beiersdorf (with Kai Hüner, Andreas Schierning, and Boris Otto), Electronic Markets (2011)
- Collaborative management of business metadata (with Kai Hüner and Boris Otto), International Journal of Information Management (2011)
- Memorandum on design-oriented information system research (with Jörg Becker, Ulrich Frank, Thomas Hess, Dimitris Karagiannis, Helmut Krcmar, Peter Loos, Peter Mertens, Andreas Oberweis, and Elmar J. Sinz), European Journal of Information Systems (2010)
- Management of the Master Data Lifecycle: A Framework for Analysis (with Martin Ofner, Kevin Straub, and Boris Otto), Journal of Enterprise Information Management (2004)
