= Walter Brenner =

Walter Brenner may refer to:

- Walter Brenner (chemical engineer) (1923–2017), Austrian-American professor of chemical engineering and inventor
- Walter Brenner (computer scientist) (born 1958), Swiss academic
