= Ropa =

Ropa may refer to:

- Ropa, Croatia, a village
- Ropa, Lesser Poland Voivodeship, a village in Poland
- Gmina Ropa, a municipality in Poland
- Ropa (river), a river in southern Poland

== See also ==
- ROPA (disambiguation)
