= Brecht (disambiguation) =

Bertolt Brecht was a German poet and playwright.

Brecht may also refer to:

- Brecht (name)
- Brecht, Belgium, a town in the province of Antwerp, Belgium
  - Brecht Abbey, a trappist abbey in the same town
- Brecht, Germany, a municipality in Rhineland-Palatinate, Germany
- Brecht (film), a German film about Bertolt Brecht, directed by Heinrich Breloer
