= Pousttchi =

Pousttchi is a surname. Notable people with the surname include:

- Bettina Pousttchi (born 1971), German artist
- Key Pousttchi (born 1970), German business theorist
