= Brenna =

Brenna may refer to:

== People ==
- Brenna Hassett, American British bioarchaeologist
- Brenna O'Brien (born 1991), Canadian actress
- Brenna Sakas (born 1984), American beauty queen
- Cristian Brenna (1970–2025), Italian rock climber and mountaineer
- Giuseppe Brenna (1898–1980), Italian cyclist
- Tom Brenna (born 1959), American scientist
- Troy Brenna (born 1970), American actor
- Vincenzo Brenna (1747–1820), Italian architect and painter
- Wilhelm Brenna (born 1979), Norwegian ski jumper

== Places ==
=== Germany ===
- Brenna, a fortress of the Slavic Stodoranie tribe at Brandenburg an der Havel, Brandenburg

=== Italy ===
- Brenna, Lombardy, a comune in the Province of Como
- Brenna, Tuscany, a village in the comune of Sovicille in the Province of Siena

=== Norway ===
- Brenna, Finnmark, a village in Porsanger Municipality in Finnmark county

=== Poland ===
- Brenna, Poland, a village in Cieszyn County, Silesia
- Gmina Brenna, a gmina in Cieszyn County, Silesia

== See also ==
- Brenner (disambiguation)
