= Ulrich Frank =

German computer scientist

- Born: 1958 (age 67–68)
- Known for: Multi-Perspective Enterprise Modeling (MEMO)

Academic background
- Education: University of Cologne; University of Mannheim; University of Marburg

Academic work
- Discipline: Business informatics

Ulrich Frank (born 1958) is a German Business informatician and Professor of Business informatics at the University of Duisburg-Essen, known for his work on the state of the art in information systems research and the development of the Multi-Perspective Enterprise Modeling (MEMO) meta modelling framework.

== Life and work ==
After studying business administration at the University of Cologne, Frank in 1988 received his doctorate from the University of Mannheim with a dissertation, entitled "Expertensysteme – Neue Automatisierungspotentiale im Büro- und Verwaltungsbereich" (Expert systems - New Potentials for automation in office and administration area).

Frank wrote his habilitation in 1993 at the University of Marburg, and was appointed Professor of computer science at the University of Koblenz-Landau in 1994. In 2004 Frank moved to the University of Duisburg-Essen, where he was appointed Professor of computer science and business enterprise modeling.

The focus of Frank's work is on multi-perspective enterprise modeling. He has developed and researched the (meta-) method Multi-Perspective Enterprise Modeling (MEMO), which propagates a scientific approach of enterprise modeling and adds value in the discourse of integrative modeling, across the functional areas of business functions.

== Selected publications ==
Frank published several books and articles. Books:

- Ulrich Frank. Expertensysteme: Neue Automatisierungspotentiale im Büro- und Verwaltungsbereich?, Gabler, 1988.
- Ulrich Frank and J. Kronen. Kommunikationsanalyseverfahren als Grundlage der Gestaltung von Informationssystemen: Konzeptioneller Bezugsrahmen, Anwendungspraxis und Perspektiven, Vieweg, 1991.
- Ulrich Frank. Multiperspektivische Unternehmensmodellierung: Theoretischer Hintergrund und Entwurf einer objektorientierten Entwicklungsumgebung, Oldenbourg Verlag, 1994.

Articles, a selection:

- Frank, Ulrich. "Multi-perspective enterprise modeling: foundational concepts, prospects and future research challenges." Software & Systems Modeling, July 2014, Volume 13, Issue 3, pp 941–962.
- Frank, Ulrich. "Conceptual modelling as the core of the information systems discipline-perspectives and epistemological challenges." AMCIS 1999 Proceedings (1999): 240.
- Frank, Ulrich. "Multi-perspective enterprise modeling (memo) conceptual framework and modeling languages." System Sciences, 2002. HICSS. Proceedings of the 35th Annual Hawaii International Conference on. IEEE, 2002.
- Frank, Ulrich. "Evaluation of reference models." Reference modeling for business systems analysis (2007): 118-140.
- Frank, Ulrich. Towards a pluralistic conception of research methods in information systems research. No. 7. ICB-research report, 2006.
- Hubert Österle, Jörg Becker, Ulrich Frank, Thomas Hess, Dimitris Karagiannis, Helmut Krcmar, Peter Loos, Peter Mertens, Andreas Oberweis, and Elmar J. Sinz (2011). "Memorandum on design-oriented information systems research." European Journal of Information Systems, 20(1), 7-10.
