= Brenman =

Brenman is a German and Ashkenazi Jewish surname. As a Yiddish spelling variant of German Brennemann (English language version: Brenneman) it is probably a variant of the family name Brenner (agent derivative of German brennen "to burn"). Notable people with the surname include:

- Greg Brenman, English film and television producer
- Ilan Brenman (born 1973), Israeli author
- Margaret Brenman-Gibson (died 2004), American psychologist and biographer
- Owen Brenman (born 1956), English actor

== See also ==
- Brennan
- Brenneman
- Brenner (surname)
