= Brener =

Brener is a surname. Notable people with the surname include:

- Brener (footballer) (born 1975), Brazilian football player
- Abraham Moshe Brener (died 1968), Polish-born rabbi
- Alexander Brener (born 1957), Russian performance artist
- Angèle Diabang Brener (born 1979), Senegalese screenwriter, director and film producer
- Avia Brener (born 1994), Israeli acrobatic gymnast
- Fabricio Brener (born 1998), Argentine football player
- Igal Brener, Israeli-American physicist
- Ilja Brener (born 1989), Russian-born German chess player
- Josh Brener (born 1984), American actor
- Mark Brener, American businessman
- Moshe Brener (born 1971), Israeli basketball player
- Pynchas Brener (born 1931), Ashkenazi rabbi
- Roland Brener (1942–2006), South African-born Canadian artist
- Roman Brener (1932–1991), Soviet and Ukrainian diver and pool player
- Sandra Brener Rosenthal (1936–2024), American philosopher
- Sergey Brener (born 1971), Uzbekistani freestyle skier
- Shmulik Brener (born 1981), Israeli basketball player and coach
- Yolande Brener, English author and actress

== See also ==
- Brenner (surname)
