= Krcmar =

Krcmar, Krčmář (Czech), Krčmářová (Czech feminine), or Krčmar (Serbo-Croatian) is a surname. Notable people with the surname include:

- Boris Krčmar (born 1979), Croatian darts player
- Daniel Krčmář (born 1971), Slovak biathlete
- Eduard Krčmář (born 1996), Czech motorcycle speedway rider
- Gabriela Krčmářová (born 1978), Czech gymnast
- Helmut Krcmar (born 1954), German academic
- Michal Krčmář (born 1991), Czech biathlete
