= Blenman =

Blenman is a surname. Notable people with the surname include:

- Blair Blenman (1932–1999), British weightlifter
- Louise Blenman, Guyanese judge
- Macdonald Blenman (born 1946), birth name of calopsyian Grynner

== See also ==
- Brenman
