= Łosie, Gorlice County =

Łosie
- Village
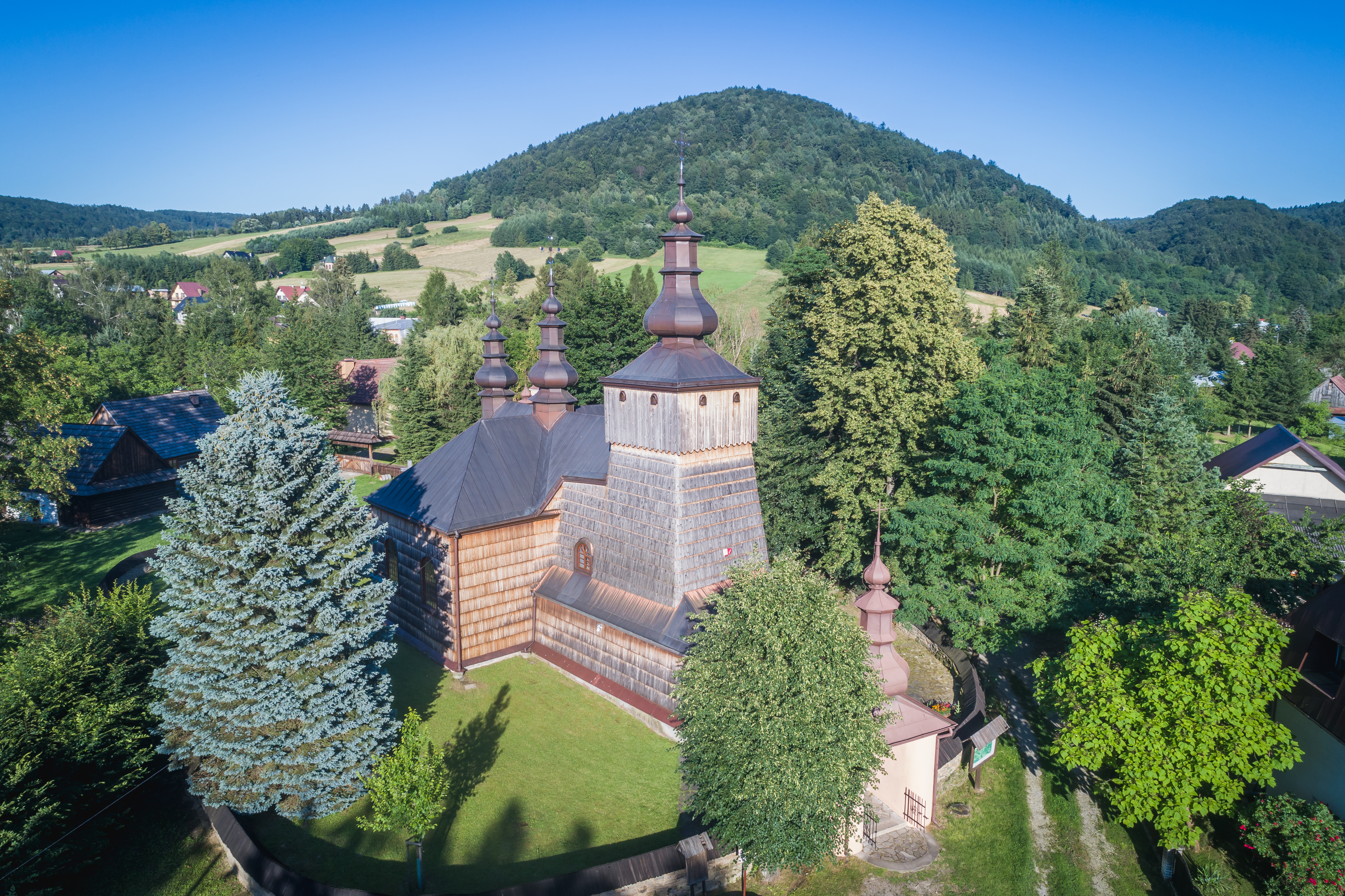
- Orthodox church

- Location within Poland
- Coordinates: 49°35′N 21°6′E
- Country: Poland
- Voivodeship: Lesser Poland
- County: Gorlice
- Gmina: Ropa
- Population: 770

Łosie [ˈwɔɕɛ] is a village in the administrative district of Gmina Ropa, within Gorlice County, Lesser Poland Voivodeship, in southern Poland.
