= Gmina Ropa =

Gmina Ropa Ropa Commune
- Gmina
- Interactive map of Gmina Ropa
- Coordinates (Ropa): 49°36′N 21°3′E
- Country: Poland
- Voivodeship: Lesser Poland
- County: Gorlice
- Seat: Ropa

Area
  - Total: 49.1 km^{2} (19.0 sq mi)

Population (2024)
  - Total: 5,509
  - Density: 112/km^{2} (290/sq mi)
- Website: https://www.eu-ropa.pl/

Gmina Ropa is a rural gmina (administrative district) in Gorlice County, Lesser Poland Voivodeship, in southern Poland. The seat of the district is the village of Ropa, which lies approximately 11 kilometres (7 mi) south-west of Gorlice and 95 km (59 mi) south-east of the regional capital Kraków.

The gmina covers an area of 49.1 square kilometres (19.0 sq mi), had a total population of 5,509 as of 2024.The population (2002-2024) increased by 10.1%.

== History ==
The collective municipality of Ropa was established on August 1, 1934, in the Gorlice County in the Kraków Province from the existing individual rural municipalities of Bielanka, Gródek, Łosie, Ropa, and Szymbark.

After the war, the municipality of Ropa (together with the entire Gorlice County) became part of the newly created Rzeszów Province. As of July 1, 1952, the municipality consisted of five communities: Bielanka, Gródek, Łosie, Ropa, and Szymbark. The commune was abolished on September 29, 1954, along with the reform introducing gromady (villages) in place of communes.

The municipality of Ropa was reactivated within expanded borders on January 1, 1973, in the same county and province, consisting of nine villages: Banica, Bielanka, Brunary, Czarna, Gródek, Izby, Łosie, Stawisza, Śnietnica, and Ropa. On June 1, 1975, the municipality became part of the newly created Nowy Sącz Province.

On January 15, 1976, the municipality was abolished and its area was incorporated into the municipalities of:

- Gorlice (areas of the villages of Bielanka and Ropa),
- Grybów (area of the village of Gródek),
- Uście Gorlickie (areas of the villages of Banica, Brunary, Czarna, Izby, Łosie, Stawisza, and Śnietnica).

The municipality of Ropa was reactivated for the third time on April 2, 1991, this time with a very small area. It consisted of only the villages of Ropa from the municipality of Gorlice and Łosie from the municipality of Uście Gorlickie . On January 1, 1997, 50 hectares of the village of Brunary, called Zalesie, was added to the municipality of Ropa from the municipality of Uście Gorlickie, and on January 1, 2000, the village of Klimkówka, which had never previously belonged to the municipality of Ropa, was added from the municipality of Uście Gorlickie.

== Villages ==
The gmina contains the villages of Klimkówka, Łosie and Ropa.

== Neighbouring Gminas ==
Gmina Ropa borders the town of Grybów and the communes of Gorlice, Grybów and Uście Gorlickie.

== Partner towns ==
- Hažlín (Slovakia)
