= Brynner (disambiguation) =

Yul Brynner (1920–1985) was a Russian-born American actor.

Brynner may also refer to:

- Irena Brynner (1917–2003), Russian-born American sculptor, jewelry designer, mezzo-soprano singer and author, cousin of Yul Brynner
- Lord Brynner, stage name of Trinidadian calypso singer Kade Simon (c. 1937–1985)

== See also ==
- Brenner (disambiguation)
