= Klimkówka, Gorlice County =

Klimkówka
- Village
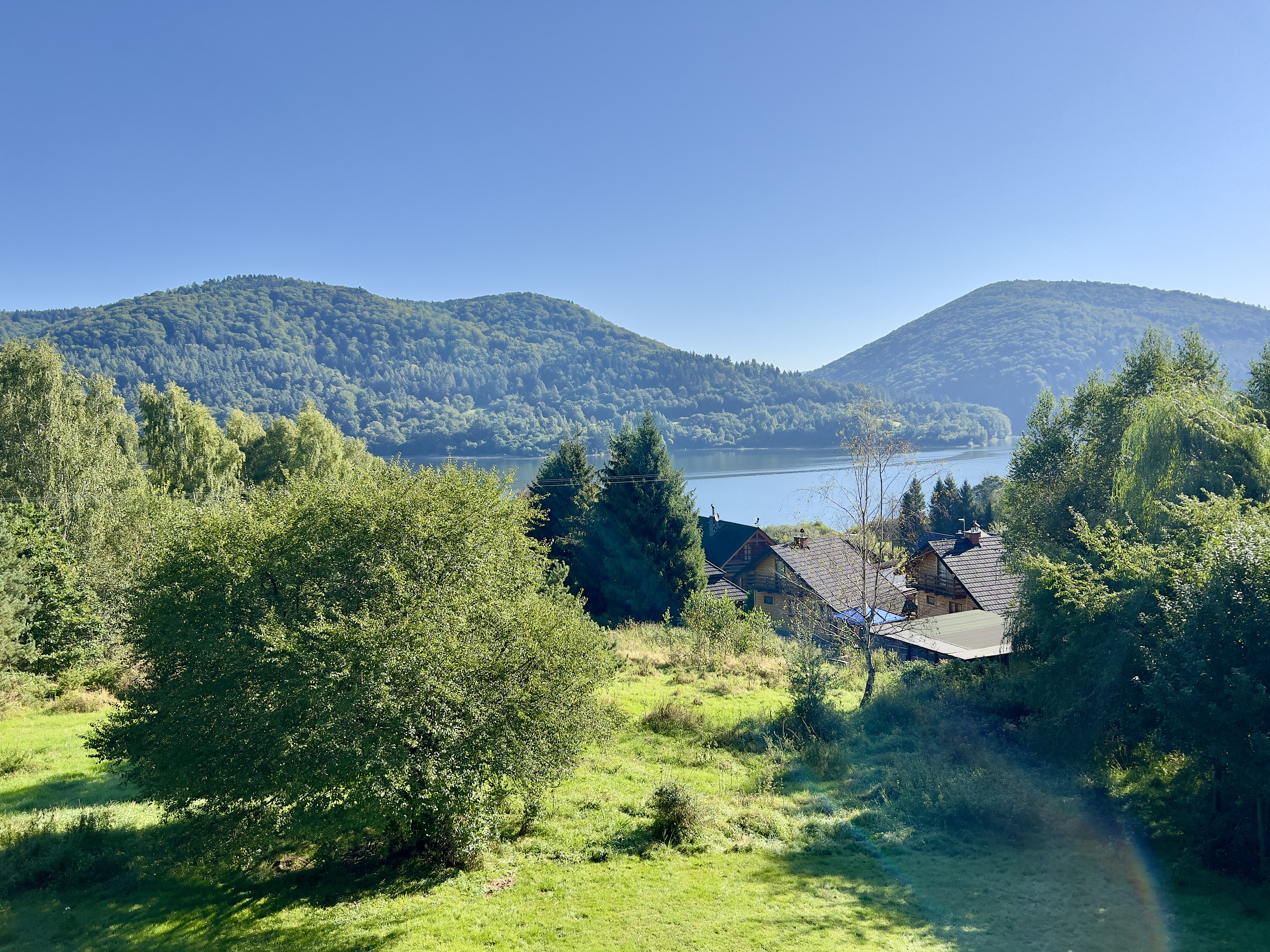
- Klimkowskie Lake

- Location within Poland
- Coordinates: 49°33′N 21°6′E
- Country: Poland
- Voivodeship: Lesser Poland
- County: Gorlice
- Gmina: Ropa

Klimkówka [klʲimˈkufka] (Note: Lemko Rusyn: Клемківка, Klemkivka) is a village in the administrative district of Gmina Ropa, within Gorlice County, Lesser Poland Voivodeship, in southern Poland.
