= Brenner =

Brenner may refer to:

- Brenner (surname)
- Brenner (crater)
- Brenner (TV series), a television series from 1959 to 1964
- Brenner, South Tyrol, a municipality in South Tyrol, Italy
- Brenner, Kansas, a community in the United States
- Brenner Pass, a pass through the Alps, linking Italy and Austria
  - Brenner Base Tunnel, a railway tunnel through the base of the Brenner massif
- Brenner Railway
- Brenner Regional Council, a regional council in Israel
- Brenner tumour
- Brenner (footballer, born 1994), Brenner Marlos Varanda de Oliveira, Brazilian football forward for Thép Xanh Nam Định
- Brenner (footballer, born 1999), Brenner Alves Sabino, Brazilian football forward for Iwate Grulla Morioka
- Brenner (footballer, born 2000), Brenner Souza da Silva, Brazilian football forward for Udinese Calcio
- Brenner (footballer, born 2002), Brenner Lucas Gonçalves Santos, Brazilian football winger for Santa Clara

== See also ==
- Brenna (disambiguation)
- Givat Brenner, a kibbutz in Israel
- Crick, Brenner et al. experiment
- Steinach am Brenner, a town in Austria
