= Konrad Hilbers =

Konrad Hilbers (born 1963) is a German businessman, organizational theorist, and Adjunct Professor "Practice of Information and Media management" at LMU Munich.

== Biography ==
Born in Ibbenbüren, Hilbers received his MS in 1988 in economics at the University of Münster, then his PhD in economics at the University of St. Gallen.

From 1992, he started in Corporate Development at Bertelsmann in Gütersloh. In 1993, he became Chief Executive Officer of the Sendezentrum Köln GmbH in Cologne, and Senior Vice President and Chief Financial Officer at the Bantam Doubleday Dell Publishing in New York City in 1994. He returned to Bertelsmann in 1996 working for AOL/Bertelsmann in Europe. In 2001, he was Chief Administration Officer at Bertelsmann's music division in New York, when he moved to Napster to become Chief Executive Officer. From 2003 to 2007, he was Chief Executive Officer at the German teleshopping company Home Shopping Europe AG, and from 2007 to 2008 Chief Financial Officer at Primondo, in 2008-09 manager of the Quelle, nowadays Arcandor, and since 2010 Chairman of advisory board of the HSE24, a sister network of the Home Shopping Network, and independent.

In 2003, Hilbers started as lecturer at LMU Munich, where he is an adjunct professor for "Practice of Information and Media management" since 2010.

== Selected publications ==
- Österle, Hubert, Walter Brenner, and Konrad Hilbers. Unternehmensführung und Informationssystem: Der Ansatz des St. Galler Informationssystem-Managements. Walter Brenner, 1991.
- Österle, Hubert, Walter Brenner, and Konrad Hilbers. Total information systems management: a European approach. John Wiley & Sons, Inc., 1993.
- Wilde, T., Hess, T., Hilbers, K., & Str, N. (2008). "Akzeptanzforschung bei nicht marktreifen Technologien: typische methodische Probleme und deren Auswirkungen." In Multikonferenz Wirtschaftsinformatik (Vol. 2008).
