= Key Pousttchi =

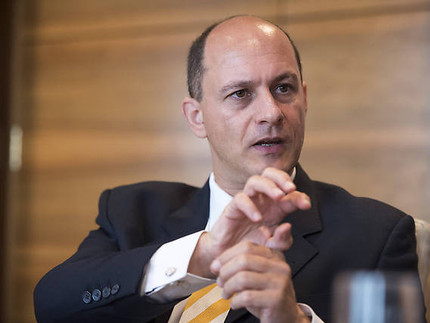

Key Pousttchi (born 1970 in Rheine, Germany) is a professor of Business Informatics and Digitalization, author and entrepreneur. From 2015 to 2020 he held the SAP Endowed Chair at the University of Potsdam's Faculty of Economics and Social Sciences, where he was also the director of their Master of Science program in digital transformation, in co-operation with the Hasso-Plattner Institute. His research focuses on the impact of digitalization on everyday life, economy and society as well as on digital transformation strategies for traditional industries.

== Biography ==
Pousttchi served as a German army officer from 1989 to 2001. After basic and officer training in Oldenburg and Hannover he served as a platoon leader in an armored reconnaissance battalion in Lüneburg. From 1992 to 1996 he studied Business and Business Informatics at the University of the German Federal Armed Forces in Munich. After completing his degree, he served in a tank battalion in Lüneburg and 1997-1998 as the spokesman of the General commanding the Franco-German Brigade in the SFOR stabilization mission to Bosnia and Herzegovina. After a stage as deputy company commander of a tank company in Pfreimd he was promoted to the rank of captain and became responsible for laser-based battle simulation systems and IT consulting on behalf of the General of the Infantry in Hammelburg and in 2000, returned to University of the German Federal Armed Forces in Munich as a researcher.

After his military service in 2001, he became head of a research group on mobile commerce at the University of Augsburg's Business School, being promoted to assistant professor in 2004 and to associate professor in 2009, after completing his PhD on mobile payment systems respectively second PhD (habilitation degree) on mobile business for consumer and enterprise applications. He also taught courses at the University of Zurich, University of Frankfurt and the University of Magdeburg. 2013 he hosted the International Conference on Mobile Business (ICMB) in Berlin as a general chair. 2015 he became a full professor at the University of Potsdam. 2017 he introduced the first German master program on Business Informatics and Digital Transformation which became noted for its interdisciplinary approach. The program was inaugurated by EU commissioner Günther Oettinger. In addition to his scientific work, Pousttchi is active as a business consultant and professional keynote speaker. He is the author/editor of more than 10 books, more than 60 peer-reviewed research articles, and is frequently cited in the media (e.g.,).

== Significant publications ==
- Surrounded by middlemen – how multi‐sided platforms change the value network in the insurance industry. In: Electronic Markets 29 (2019) 4, pp. 609–629, with Alexander Gleiß.
- Exploring the digitalization impact on consumer decision‐making in retail banking. In: Electronic Markets 28 (2018) 3, pp. 265‐286, with Maik Dehnert.
- Mobile Commerce Research Yesterday, Today, Tomorrow—What Remains to Be Done? In: International Journal of Electronic Commerce 19 (2015) 4, pp. 1‐20, with David Tilson, Kalle Lyytinen, and Yvonne Hufenbach.
- The impact of new media on bank processes – a Delphi study. In: International Journal of Electronic Business 12 (2015) 1, pp. 1‐45, with Jürgen Moormann and Josef Felten.
- Requirements for personalized m-commerce – what drives consumers’ use of social networks? In: Journal of Electronic Commerce in Organizations 11 (2013) 4, pp. 19–36, with Laura Becker.
- Enabling Evidence-based Retail Marketing with the Use of Payment Data – the Mobile Payment Reference Model 2.0. In: International Journal of Business Intelligence and Data Mining 8 (2013) 1, with Yvonne Hufenbach.
- Value creation in the mobile market - A Reference Model for the Role(s) of the Future Mobile Network Operator. Business & Information Systems Engineering 53 (2011) 5, pp. 300–311, with Yvonne Hufenbach.
- Determinants of customer acceptance for mobile data services: An empirical analysis with formative constructs. In: International Journal of Electronic Business 9 (2011) 1–2, pp. 26–43, with Laura Goeke.
- Mobile word-of-mouth – A grounded theory of mobile viral marketing. In: Journal of Information Technology 24 (2009) 2, pp. 172–185, with Wolfgang Palka and Dietmar Wiedemann.
- Proposing a comprehensive framework for analysis and engineering of mobile payment business models. In: Information Systems and e-Business Management 7 (2009) 3, pp. 363–393, with Max Schießler and Dietmar Wiedemann.
- A modeling approach and reference models for the analysis of mobile payment use cases. In: Electronic Commerce Research and Applications 7 (2008) 2, pp. 182–201.
- Mobile Payment Procedures: Scope and Characteristics. In: eService Journal Vol. 2 (2003) 3, pp. 7–22, with Nina Kreyer and Klaus Turowski.
- Mobile Commerce – Grundlagen und Techniken. Springer, Heidelberg 2003, with Klaus Turowski (first textbook on mobile commerce).
