= Kazimierz Brenner =

Polish partizan, soldier of World War II

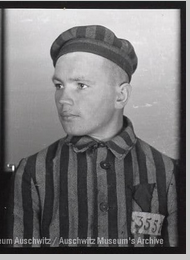
- Born: June 1, 1917; Nowy Sącz
- Died: June 26, 1944; Szymbark
- Military career
- Branch: Polish Army; Home Army
- Service years: 1939–1944
- Nickname: Oświęcim
- Unit: 1 Pułk Strzelców Podhalańskich AK
- Conflicts: World War II: Polish Defensive War

Kazimierz Brenner alias "Oświęcim" (born June 1, 1917 in Nowy Sącz, died June 26, 1944 in Szymbark) - prisoner of the KL Auschwitz concentration camp (camp no. 3551), soldier of the "Żbik (Note: Żbik means wildcat in Polish.)" partisan unit of the Home Army.

== Background ==
During the September Campaign of 1939, Kazimierz served as a non-commissioned officer in the Polish Signal Corps. In 1940, during the Nazi Germany occupation of Poland, he illegally crossed the border into Slovakia in an attempt to reach Hungary and continue the fight. He was arrested in Slovakia and handed over to the German border guards in Muszyna. After being interrogated by the Gestapo, he was imprisoned in Tarnów and later transported to KL Auschwitz, where he was registered as prisoner no. 3551 on August 30, 1940. On April 5, 1943, he managed to escape the camp, (Note: 928 people escaped from the KL Auschwitz camp complex, 433 people were captured, 196 of the escapees survived the end of the war, the fate of the remaining 254 escapees is currently unknown. Data: „UCIECZKI Z KL AUSCHWITZ”, auchwitz.org, access date: March 2022.) returned to the vicinity of Nowy Sącz, and joined the "Żbik" Home Army partisan unit operating in the Gorlice District. In retaliation for his escape, the Gestapo arrested his parents and sent them to KL Auschwitz, where both perished.

== Death ==
On June 26, 1944, around 3:00 in the morning, German field gendarmerie conducted a raid in the village of Ropa near Gorlice, searching the homes of local inhabitants for partisans and their supporters. Informed of the German activity, Stanisław Siemek, alias "Świerk," decided to take action to rescue partisans who had been captured and were being transported to the Gestapo headquarters in Gorlice. Kazimierz Brenner volunteered to join the operation.

Partisans of OP "Żbik" ambushed the convoy on the road in the village of Szymbark. Kazimierz was assigned to secure the site of the attack. Two Germans were killed by accurate partisan fire; the others took cover behind an embankment and returned fire. During the exchange of shots, the frightened horses pulling the cart carrying the prisoners fled the scene.

Meanwhile, a German vehicle arrived from Gorlice to reinforce the convoy. Kazimierz attempted to attack the vehicle by throwing hand grenades. It is unclear whether a faulty grenade exploded prematurely or if he was shot before he could throw it. As a result, he was killed. The operation was ultimately successful: four partisans were freed. However, Kazimierz Brenner was killed, and Władysław Kędra, alias "Shadow," was seriously wounded. Kędra managed to crawl into a nearby field, where a farmer discovered him and alerted the Germans, who executed wounded man on the spot.

== Posthumous honors ==
In 1989, on the roadside of Grybów-Gorlice DK28 road in Szymbark a monument was erected to commemorate the place of action of the "Żbik" partisan unit and two fallen partisans: Kazimierz Brenner alias "Oświęcim" and Władysław Kędra alias "Shadow". Kazimierz Brenner, a soldier of the Home Army, was buried at the parish cemetery in Szymbark.

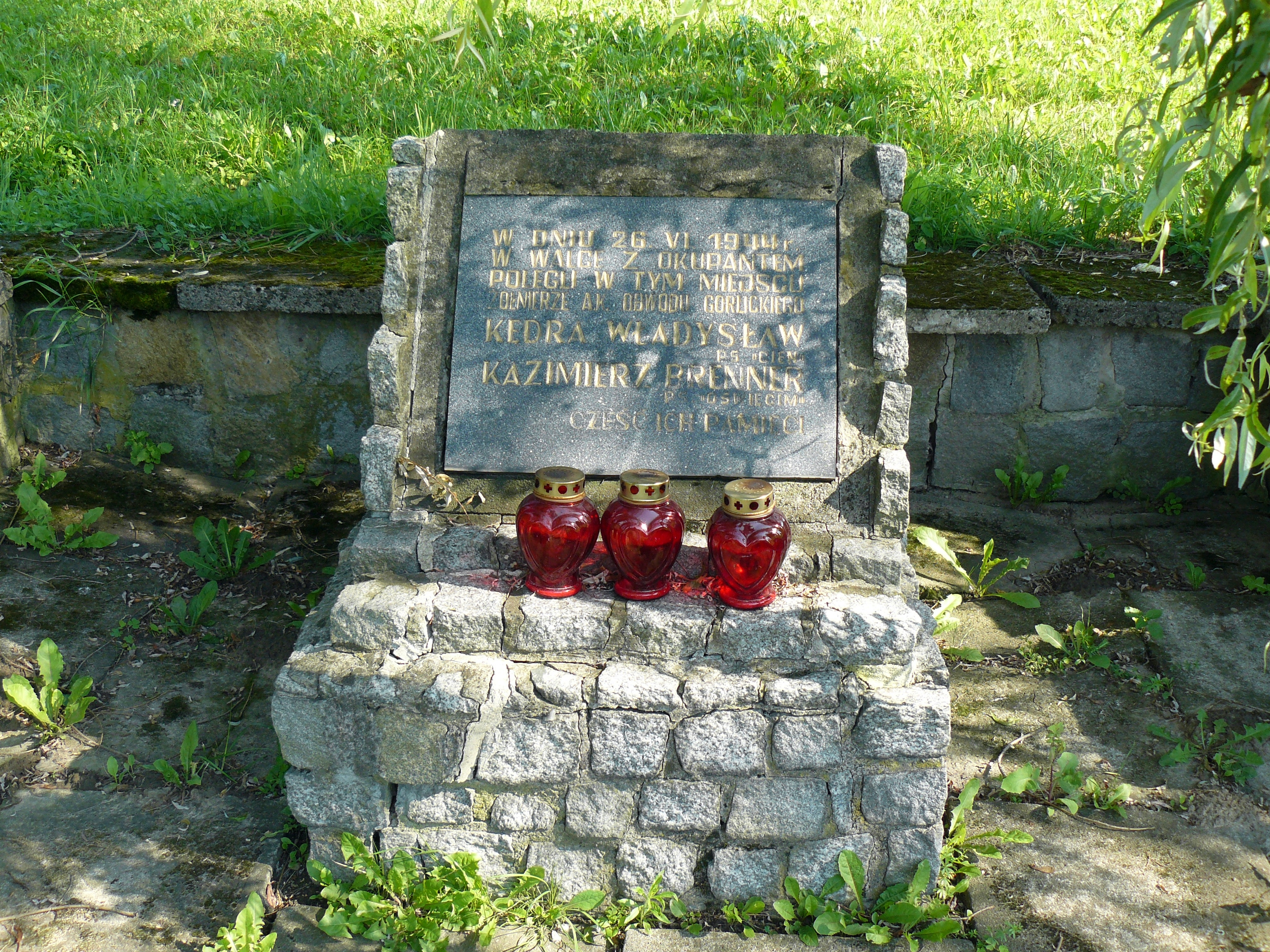
Szymbark, monument

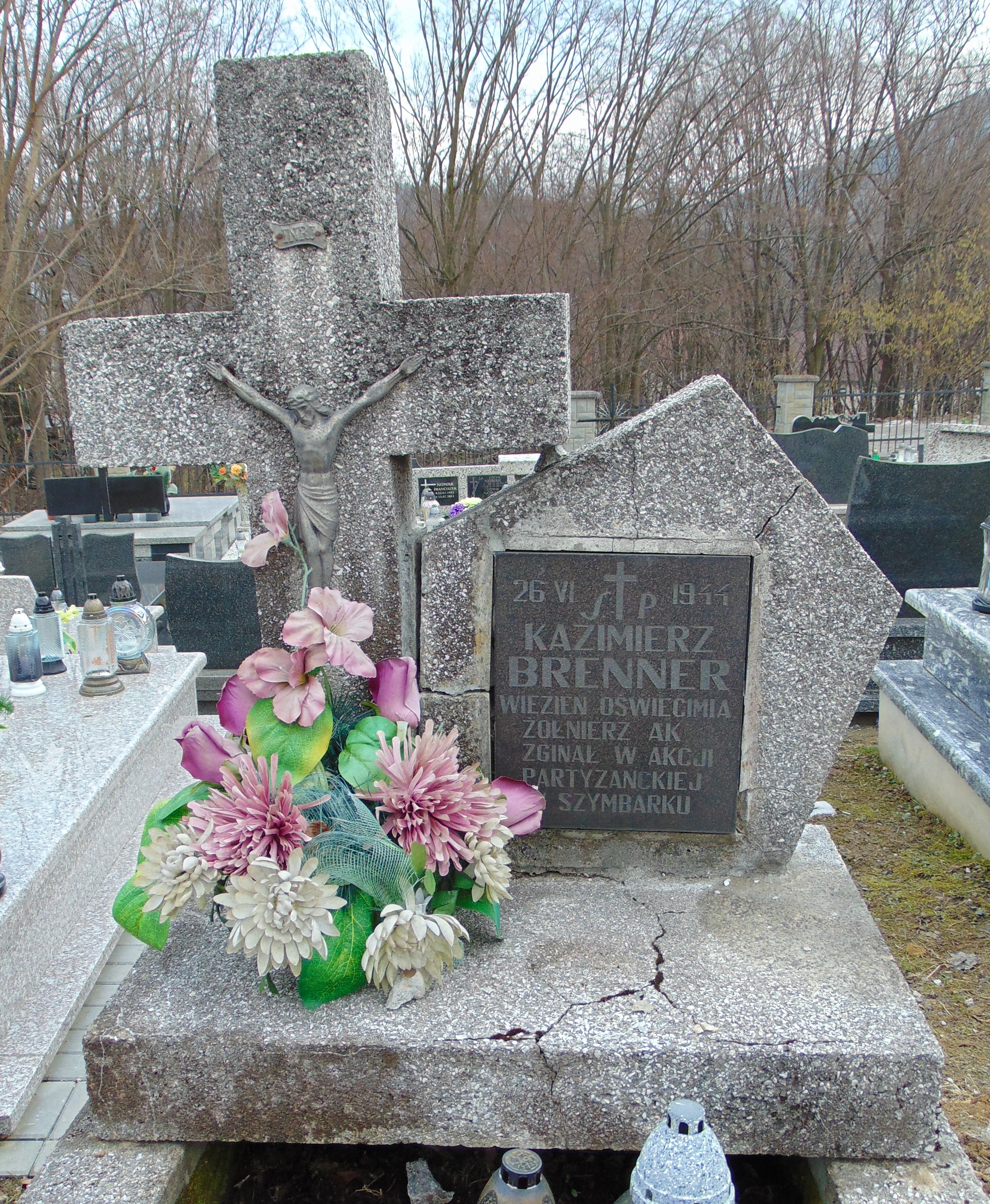
Kazimierz Brenner's grave in Szymbark
