= Brecht (name) =

Brecht is both a surname and a masculine given name. Notable people with the name include:

Surname:

- Arnold Brecht (1884–1977), German jurist and government official
- Bertolt Brecht (1898–1956), German poet, playwright, and theatre director
- Eberhard Brecht (born 1950), German politician
- Eugen Brecht (1912–1944), German military officer
- George Brecht (1926–2008), American chemist and artist
- Jürgen Brecht (born 1940), German fencer
- Kurt Brecht (born 1961), American singer and writer
- Leo Brecht (born 1962), German organizational theorist, consultant and professor
- Martin Brecht (born 1932), German academic and biographer
- Stefan Brecht (1924–2009), German-born American poet and scholar of theater

Given name:

- Brecht Capon (born 1988), Belgian footballer
- Brecht Dejaegere (born 1991), Belgian footballer
- Brecht Rodenburg (born 1967), Dutch volleyball player
- Brecht Verbrugghe (born 1982), Belgian footballer
- Brecht Wallis (born 1977), Belgian kickboxer
