= Hažlín =

- Municipality
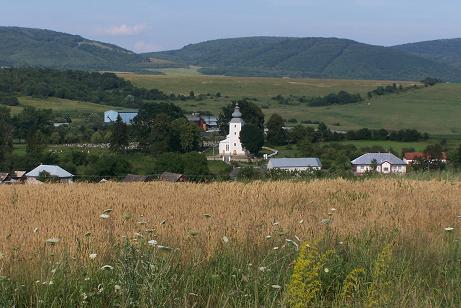

- Flag Coat of arms

- Location of Hažlín in the Prešov Region Location of Hažlín in Slovakia
- Coordinates: 49.30°N 21.43°E
- Country: Slovakia
- Region: Prešov Region
- District: Bardejov District
- First mentioned: 1414

Area
  - Total: 20.11 km^{2} (7.76 sq mi)
- Elevation: 283 m (928 ft)

Population (2025)
  - Total: 1,056
- Time zone: UTC+1 (CET)
  - Summer (DST): UTC+2 (CEST)
- Postal code: 861 4
- Area code: +421 54
- Vehicle registration plate (until 2022): BJ
- Website: www.obechazlin.sk

Hažlín is a village and municipality in Bardejov District in the Prešov Region of north-east Slovakia.

== History ==
In historical records the village was first mentioned in 1414.

== Geography ==
The municipality lies at an altitude of 283 metres (928 ft) and covers an area of 20.11 km^{2} (7.76 sq mi) (2025).

== Population ==
Population statistic (10 years)
Year	1995	2005	2015	2025
Count	1197	1173	1137	1056
Difference		−2.00%	−3.06%	−7.12%

Population statistic
Year	2024	2025
Count	1058	1056
Difference		−0.18%

It has a population of 1056 people (31 December 2025).

=== Ethnicity ===
Census 2021 (1+ %)
Ethnicity	Number	Fraction
Slovak	1043	96.75%
Rusyn	30	2.78%
Not found out	24	2.22%
Total	1078	

In year 2021 was 1078 people by ethnicity 1043 as Slovak, 30 as Rusyn, 24 as Not found out, 8 as Ukrainian, 6 as Other, 4 as Czech, 4 as Polish, 1 as Russian and 1 as Austrian.

Note on population: The difference values of population numbers in the table "Population statistic" and in the sections "Ethnicity" & "Religion" is caused by the use of various statistical methods.

=== Religion ===
Census 2021 (1+ %)
Religion	Number	Fraction
Roman Catholic Church	910	84.42%
Greek Catholic Church	91	8.44%
None	35	3.25%
Not found out	23	2.13%
Eastern Orthodox Church	11	1.02%
Total	1078	

In year 2021 was 1078 people by religion 910 from Roman Catholic Church, 91 from Greek Catholic Church, 35 from None, 23 from Not found out, 11 from Eastern Orthodox Church, 4 from Evangelical Church, 3 from Other and not ascertained christian church and 1 from Other.

== Genealogical resources and facts ==
The records for genealogical research are available at the state archive "Statny Archiv in Presov, Slovakia"

- Roman Catholic church records (births/marriages/deaths): 1750-1896 (parish A)
- Greek Catholic church records (births/marriages/deaths): 1852-1924 (parish B)

The surname "Hažlínsky" and its variants—e.g., "Haszlinsky" (a Magyar variant)—denote one with roots in Hažlín. According to FamilySearch, the surname first appeared in the 1700s in Gaboltov and not Hažlín. Incidentally, this also makes likely that Mickey Haslin (né "Hazlinsky")'s father, George Hazlinsky, was solely Matrilineally Jewish and not Jewish because of both parents (This is important to note because George Hazlinsky and his brothers were maternal siblings of a Katherine Ushinsky Gajdos, née Uszinskyovà; and she was Jewish through both her own paternal line and her and George's maternal line, that of Zsuzsanna "Anna" Jaszová Haszlinskyová Uszinskyová

(Among Anna's other children were Katherine's point of contact at Philadelphia, Marion Hazlinski (later Martin Hazlinsky); and Katherine truthfully gave his name, whereas she gave "Maria Uscianski" in order to conceal her Jewish heritage.)

== See also ==
- List of municipalities and towns in Slovakia
