= ROPA =

ROPA may refer to:

- Reception of Oocytes from Partner, an IVF technique
- Regional Orchestra Players' Association, see International Conference of Symphony and Opera Musicians
- Representation of the People Act, a United Kingdom legislation

== See also ==
- Ropa (disambiguation)
