= Igal Brener =

Israeli physicist

- יגאל ברנר
- Education: Technion – Israel Institute of Technology
- Known for: Contributions to terahertz science and technology, nanophotonics, metamaterials
- Awards: Fellow of the IEEE, Fellow of the American Physical Society, Fellow of the Optical Society of America
- Scientific career
- Fields: Physics, Electrical Engineering
- Workplaces: Sandia National Laboratories

Igal Brener (Hebrew: יגאל ברנר) is a physicist at Sandia National Laboratories who was named a Fellow of the Institute of Electrical and Electronics Engineers (IEEE) in 2014 for his contributions to terahertz science and technology. Brener is also a Fellow of the American Physical Society and the Optical Society of America. He maintains active research programs in nanophotonics, metamaterials and Terahertz S&T.

== Education ==
Brener obtained his B.Sc. in electrical engineering and physics from the Technion – Israel Institute of Technology in 1983 and in 1991 did his D.Sc. in the same field and at the same place.
