= Jean Brenner =

French painter

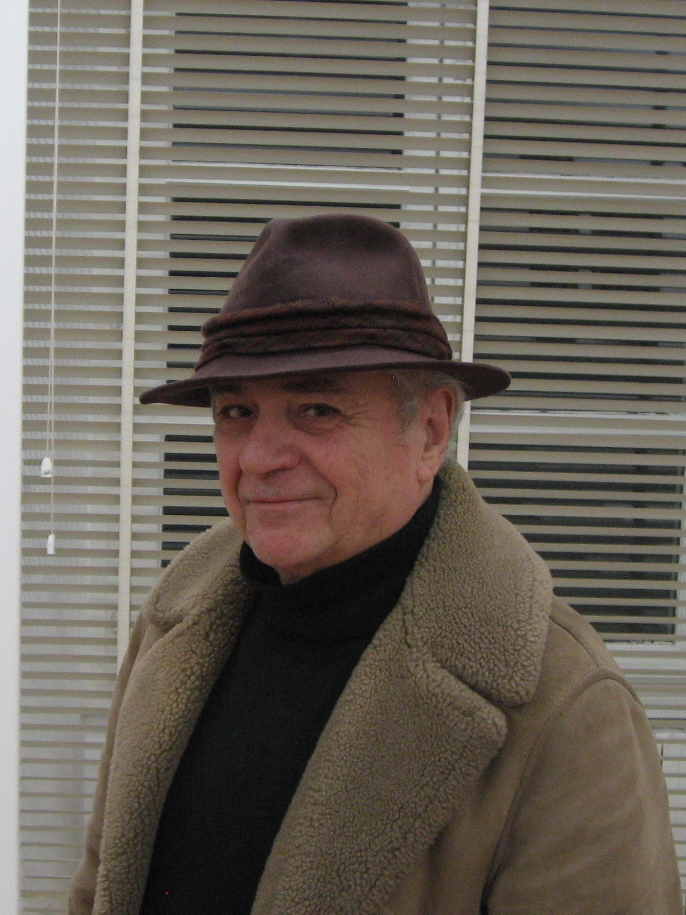
- Jean Brenner at his retrospective in his native Mulhouse, at the Musée des Beaux Arts, 2008
- Born: 23 April 1937; Mulhouse
- Died: February 2009, (aged 71)
- Education: Ecole municipale des Beaux Arts
- Known for: Engraving, Lithography, Collage, Photography.
- Awards: Palme d'Or des Beaux Arts, Monte-Carlo, 1972

Jean Brenner (23 April 1937 – February 2009) was a painter from Mulhouse, France.

== Life and work ==
Brenner came from an artist family from Alsace; his father Joseph was the professor of textile drawings. In 1956, Jean Brenner began his studies at the Ecole municipale des Beaux Arts. From 1960 to 1962, he traveled in North Africa. In 1964, he studied at the Ecole des Arts Décoratifs in Strasbourg. Brenner became an art teacher at that school, before he dedicated himself to intensive studio work to prepare his first international exhibition. His work was shown in 1971 in New York City (twice) and Berlin. He received the Palme d'Or des Beaux Arts in Monte-Carlo in 1972 and exhibited in Rome.

Since then, many further exhibitions and honours have followed. He had his first exhibition and retrospective in his hometown of Mulhouse in the Musée des Beaux Arts in the Villa Steinbach in autumn of 2008.

Brenner's media is very diverse, including techniques such as engraving, lithography, collage and photography. His paintings range from still-lifes with flowers and full landscapes to abstract portraits in black and white. Some of his works reference Cézanne and Monet. He spoke fluent French, German, English and his native Alsatian.

Jean Brenner died in February 2009.

== Awards ==
- 1972 Palme d'Or des Beaux Arts, Monte-Carlo
