= Mayor Brenner =

Soviet pianist (1906–1973)

Mayor Rafailoviç Brenner
- Born: 7 January 1907; Dnipro, Russian Empire
- Died: 7 April 1973 (aged 66); Baku, Azerbaijan SSR
- Citizenship: Soviet Union; Azerbaijani Republic
- Occupation: Actress

Mayor Rafaelovich Brenner (Azerbaijani:Mayor Rafailoviç Brenner, b. 7 January 1907, Dnipro, Russian Empire - d. 7 April 1973, Baku, Azerbaijan SSR) was a Soviet pianist and music teacher. People's Artist of the Azerbaijan SSR (1968).

He was a student of Uzeyir Hajibeyov.

== Life ==
After graduating from the Ekaterinoslav Music Technical School, he entered the Saint Petersburg Conservatory in the class of Leonid Nikolaev. Upon completing his studies at the conservatory, he performed as a soloist and ensemble musician. From the mid-1930s, he settled in Baku and completed his postgraduate studies at the Baku Conservatory under the guidance of Uzeyir Hajibeyov.

In the 1930s and 1940s, he became the first performer of several works by Azerbaijani composers such as Gara Garayev, Fikret Amirov, and others. Brenner was one of the founders of the Azerbaijani piano school, teaching at the conservatory from 1935 and becoming a professor in 1951. Among his students was, notably, Farhad Badalbeyli.

== Death ==
He died on April 7, 1973, in Baku, and was buried in the Second Alley of Honorary Burial in Baku.

== Awards ==
- Honored Art Workers of the Azerbaijan SSR
- People's Artists of the Azerbaijan SSR
