= Helmut Krcmar =

- Born: December 16, 1954 (age 71); Hanau, Germany
- Education: Saarland University
- Scientific career
- Fields: Information Systems
- Workplaces: Technical University of Munich
- Doctoral advisor: August-Wilhelm Scheer
- Notable students: Jan Marco Leimeister; Ali Sunyaev; Axel Lamprecht; Birgit Schenk; Bernd Vöhringer

Helmut Alfred Otto Krcmar (born December 16, 1954, in Hanau, Germany) is a German information systems scholar and economist. He served as Founding Dean of the TUM Campus Heilbronn (2018–2020). Since 2020, he has been heading the KrcmarLab at the School of Computation, Information and Technology (CIT) at the Technical University of Munich (TUM). He holds the title of TUM Emeritus of Excellence within the TUM Senior Excellence Faculty.

== Career ==
Krcmar is a Senior Scholar and Fellow of the Association for Information Systems (AIS). From July 2014 to June 2015, Krcmar served as President of the Association for Information Systems (AIS).

From 1987 to 2002, Krcmar held the Chair of Information Systems at the University of Hohenheim. At the age of 32, he became full professor of business administration. From 2000 to 2002, he served as Dean of the Faculty of Business, Economics and Social Sciences at the same University. After that he held the Chair of Information Systems at Technical University of Munich (2002-2020). Additionally, he was Dean of the Department of Computer Science at Technical University of Munich (2010-2013), he was a member of both the TUM Senate and the University Council (2016-2019), he served as Vice Dean of the TUM School of Management (2018-2020). Moreover, he was the Founding Dean (2018-2020) and the President’s Representative (2018-2024) for the TUM Campus Heilbronn.

== Research and Academic Work ==
Krcmar’s research focuses on digital transformation, information management, knowledge management, platform-based ecosystems, the management of IT-based service systems, e-government, and computer-supported cooperative work (CSCW). He collaborates with international organizations and has supervised more than 100 doctoral dissertations.

He is a widely cited author (h-index 87) and serves on several editorial boards, including ACM Transactions on Management Information Systems, Electronic Markets, and Information Systems and e-Business Management (ISeB), as well as on the Advisory Board of the Journal of Information Technology (JIT) and the Honorary Board of the Journal of Strategic Information Systems (JSIS).

His book Information Management (Informationsmanagement) reached its sixth edition in 2015.

== Other Activities ==
Krcmar has been a member of the Board of the Center for Digital Technology and Management (CDTM) from 2004 to 2024. He is co-founder and former spokesperson (until 2018) of CeDoSIA, the interdisciplinary doctoral program of the Department of Informatics at TUM. From 2004 to 2007, he served as founding director of TUM Executive Education (then “Communicate! Executive Training Program Communication and Leadership”) and is currently Academic Director of the TUM EEC Executive MBA program “Business and IT”. He was Academic Director of the SAP University Competence Center (UCC) @ TUM (2003-2023) and served as Co-Managing Director of Die TUM Campus Heilbronn gGmbH (2018-2024).

Krcmar is a co-founder and Senior Fellow of fortiss gGmbH and has also served as Senior Fellow at the German Research Institute for Public Administration. He is a co-founder and, until 2019, was Chairman of the National E-Government Competence Center. From 2012 to 2024, he was a member of the Board of the Open Source Business Alliance (OSBA). He is also the founder of ITM GmbH and a co-founder of Qupe GmbH as well as Tür an Tür – Digitalfabrik gGmbH.

== Significant publications ==
- Krcmar, H; Oswald, G. 2018: Digitale Transformation. Springer Gabler, Wiesbaden 2018, ISBN 978-3-658-22623-7
- Leimeister, J.M.; Roßnagel, A.; Sunyaev, A.; Krcmar, H. 2016: Cloud-Services aus der Geschäftsperspektive. Gabler, Wiesbaden 2016, ISBN 978-3-658-08256-7
- Krcmar, H. 2015. Informationsmanagement. 6th Edition. Berlin: Springer. ISBN 978-3-662-45863-1
- Schwarzer, B., Krcmar, H., 2014: Wirtschaftsinformatik. 5. überarbeitete Auflage, Schäffer Poeschel, Stuttgart 2014, ISBN 978-3-7910-3397-6
- Reussner, R., Rumpe, B., Krcmar, H. 2014: Trusted Cloud Computing. Springer, Schweiz 2014, ISBN 978-3-319-12717-0
- Ebner, W., Leimeister, J.M., and Krcmar, H. 2009. "Community Engineering for Innovations: The Ideas Competition as a Method to Nurture a Virtual Community for Innovations," R&D Management (39:4), pp. 342–356.
- Leimeister, J.M., Huber, M., Bretschneider, U., and Krcmar, H. 2009. "Leveraging Crowdsourcing: Activation-Supporting Components for It-Based Ideas Competition," Journal of Management Information Systems (26:1), pp. 197–224.
- Webbasiertes Projekt-Coaching. Eul, Lohmar 2006, ISBN 978-3-89936-451-4
- Leimeister, J.M., Ebner, W., and Krcmar, H. 2005. "Design, Implementation, and Evaluation of Trust-Supporting Components in Virtual Communities for Patients," Journal of Management Information Systems (21:4), pp. 101–131.
- Bellmann, M.; Krcmar H., Sommerlatte, T. (Hrsg.), 2002: Praxishandbuch Wissensmanagement. Düsseldorf 2002, ISBN 978-3-933814-97-5
- Rehäuser, J., and Krcmar, H. 1996. Wissensmanagement in Unternehmen. Lehrstuhl für Wirtschaftsinformatik, Univ. Hohenheim.
- Lewe, H., Schwabe, G., Krcmar, H., 1996: Herausforderung Telekooperation. Springer, Heidelberg 1996, ISBN 978-3-540-61644-3
- Schwarzer, B., Krcmar, H., 1994: Grundlagen der Prozessorientierung. Gabler, Wiesbaden 1994, ISBN 978-3-8244-6136-3

== Awards and Honors ==
- Honorary doctorate (Dr. oec. h.c.), University of St. Gallen (2024)
- TUM Emeritus of Excellence (2021)
- Federal Cross of Merit on Ribbon (Bundesverdienstkreuz am Bande) (2021)
- Ranked 1st in the WirtschaftsWoche ranking of the most research-productive business scholars in the German-speaking region (2019)
