= Peter Brenner =

Swiss civil engineer and geologist (1937–2019)

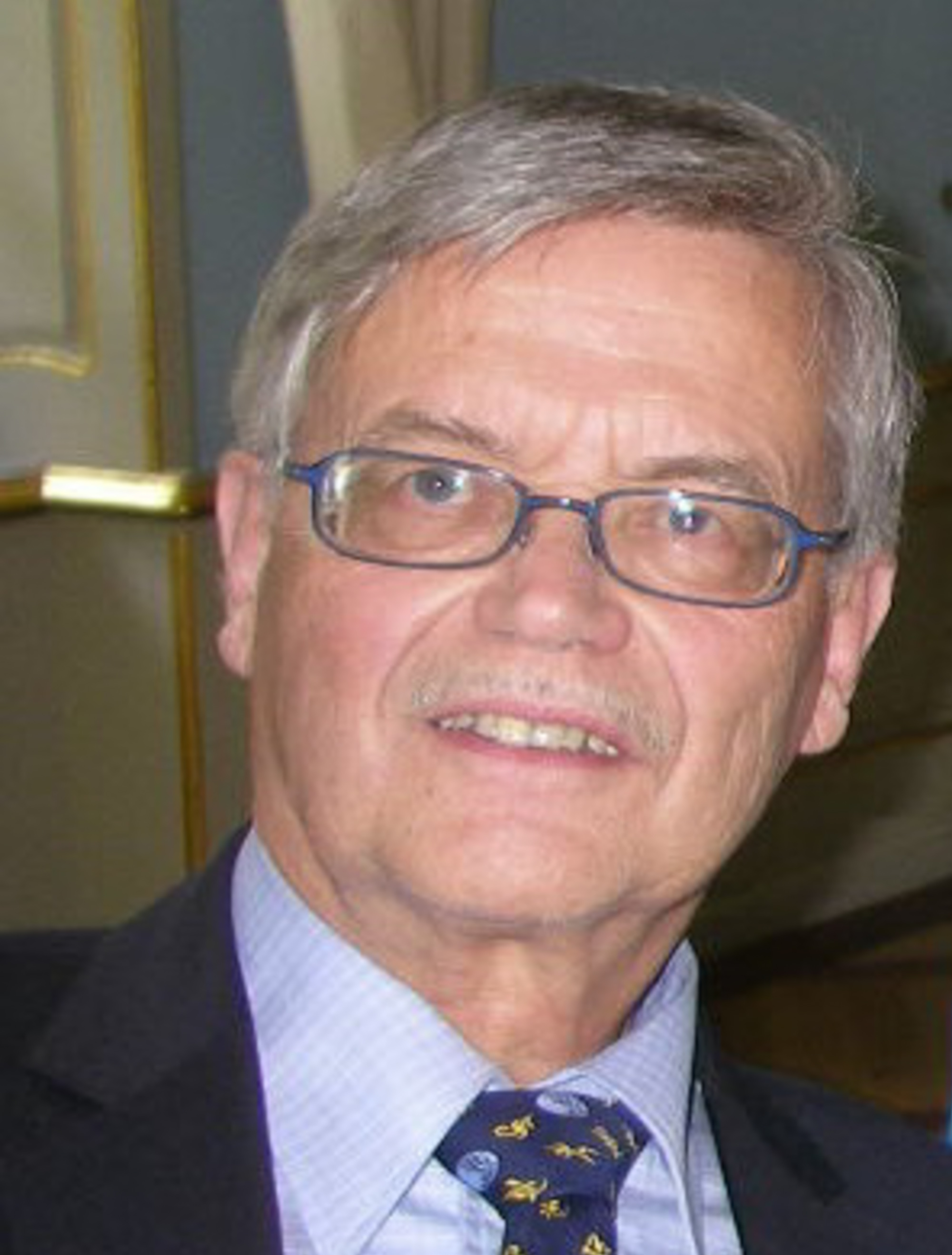
- Brenner in 2009
- Born: 14 December 1937; Frauenfeld, Switzerland
- Died: 31 March 2019 (aged 81); Weinfelden
- Education: University of Michigan, Ann Arbor, (Ph.D.)
- Known for: Soil mechanics
- Scientific career
- Fields: Geology, civil engineering
- Workplaces: Geneva, San Francisco, Zurich, Bangkok

Rolf Peter Brenner (December 14, 1937 – March 31, 2019) was a Swiss civil engineer and geologist specialized in soil mechanics.

== Life ==
Brenner graduated in civil engineering at the Swiss Federal Institute of Technology, Zurich (ETH Zurich) in 1962. He gained first professional experience at the construction company Conrad Zschokke in Geneva followed by work for Dames & Moore in San Francisco, California (later merged with URS Corporation). From 1966 to 1971, he studied at the University of Michigan, Ann Arbor, USA, in the field of soil mechanics. His doctoral thesis entitled Hydrologic model study of a forested and a cutover slope was accepted in 1971. Following his promotion, he returned to Switzerland. There, he worked for the Research Institute of Military Constructions in Zurich, where he carried out studies on the effect of nuclear explosions on soil and underground shelters.

From 1974 until 1981, he was a faculty member in the Division of Geotechnical Engineering and the Director of the Soil Mechanics Laboratory at the Asian Institute of Technology (AIT) in Bangkok, Thailand. During his term he educated many Master students from countries in Southeast Asia.

After his return to Switzerland, he worked for Electrowatt Engineering (later known as Pöyry Switzerland) in Zurich. From 1997 onwards, he was an independent geotechnical and dam engineering consultant.

Brenner was involved in dam projects worldwide for almost 30 years. Projects included the Atatürk Dam in Turkey and the Mosul Dam in Iraq, two of the largest rockfill dams in the world. Besides dams, he was involved in geotechnical analysis for the Suvarnabhumi Airport in Bangkok and the foundation design of the 372 m high Liberation Tower (Kuwait). He was called to inspect damages of earthquakes to dams such as the Sefidrud Dam or several dams in China damaged by the 2008 Wenchuan earthquake.

Brenner was chairman of the Committee on Dam Foundations of the International Commission on Large Dams (ICOLD). He was a member of the ICOLD Committee on Embankment Dams as well.

== Honors ==
- Fellow of the American Society of Civil Engineers (ASCE)
- Fellow Geological Society of London
