= Malcolm Brenner (writer) =

American author and journalist (born 1951)

Malcolm J. Brenner
- Born: 1951 (age 74–75); Perth Amboy, New Jersey, U.S.
- Education: New College of Florida
- Occupations: Novelist, journalist
- Writing career
- Language: English
- Notable work: Wet Goddess
- Website: malcolmbrenner.com

Malcolm J. Brenner (born 1951) is an American author from New Jersey, journalist, and zoophile. He is best known for his controversial novel Wet Goddess (2009), about a love affair between a college student and a bottlenose dolphin in the 1970s. As a journalist, he has covered local news in New Mexico and Florida since the early 1990s.

== Career in journalism ==
In the 1990s, Brenner worked as an investigative reporter covering the Navajo Nation and surrounding area. A 1998 article on the American Indian Movement (AIM) and Russell Means which Brenner wrote for the Gallup Independent is featured on the AIM website.

From 1992 to 1994, Brenner worked at the Farmington Daily Times. After being terminated, he filed a federal lawsuit claiming that he had been terminated for practicing Wicca.

== Wet Goddess ==
Since 2010, Brenner has gained international notoriety for his novel, Wet Goddess. The novel details several months in the life of fictional college student Zachary Zimmerman, in which the protagonist meets a dolphin named Ruby at a local theme park and falls in love with her. Brenner claims the book is autobiographical, and based on a series of events that happened to him in the 1970s. In an article in the Huffington Post, Brenner said: "I wrote this book for dolphins because we are mistreating these animals by keeping them in captivity."

== Zoophilia ==
Brenner is a self-proclaimed zoophile and zoophile advocate. He claims to have had sex with a female dolphin named Dolly in the 1970s. He stated that they "stared into each other's eyes" for moments after they had intercourse, and that they tried seven different poses.

Brenner also admits to having had sex with a dog.

== Works ==
- Wet Goddess: Recollections of a Dolphin Lover (2009)
- Growing Up in the Orgone Box: Secrets of a Reichian Childhood (2014)
- Mel-Khyor: An Interstellar Affair (2016)
