= Tom Brenna =

American scientist

James Thomas Brenna (born October 15, 1959, in New York City) is an American chemist and nutrition scientist whose research concerns fatty acid biochemistry, stable-isotope mass spectrometry, and human nutrition, particularly fatty acids. He is a professor of pediatrics, chemistry, and human nutrition at the University of Texas at Austin, based at the Dell Pediatric Research Institute, and professor emeritus of human nutrition, food science, and chemistry at Cornell University, where he served on the faculty for 28 years (1989–2017).

== Education and early career ==
Tom Brenna was raised in Naugatuck, Connecticut, and attended Holy Cross High School in Waterbury. He studied nutritional biochemistry at the University of Connecticut, working as an undergraduate research technician in the university's lipids laboratory under Robert Jensen, and graduated in 1980. He entered graduate school at Cornell University that year, joined the research group of George H. Morrison in 1982, and received a PhD in chemistry in August 1985 with a thesis on low-temperature ashing for sensitivity enhancement in biological ion microscopy. He then spent four years as a staff engineer at IBM's technology campus in Endicott, New York, before returning to Cornell as an assistant professor in 1989.

== Career ==
Brenna was a professor in the Division of Nutritional Sciences and the Department of Chemistry and Chemical Biology at Cornell University before moving to the University of Texas at Austin in 2017. His laboratory's work has spanned polyunsaturated and branched-chain fatty acid requirements in the perinatal period, mass spectrometric instrumentation for biomedical applications, and high-precision isotope-ratio mass spectrometry for anti-doping applications.

He served as President of the International Society for the Study of Fatty Acids and Lipids (ISSFAL) and on its executive committee until 2021.

== Fatty acid metabolism research ==
In the 1990s, his group's basic research on omega-3 and omega-6 fatty acid metabolism contributed to the U.S. Food and Drug Administration's acceptance of docosahexaenoic acid (DHA) and arachidonic acid as infant formula ingredients; the FDA's 2001 "no questions" letter on a GRAS notice to Mead Johnson Nutritionals cited his work.

In 2016 Brenna was senior author of a study identifying positive selection on an insertion–deletion polymorphism (rs66698963) in the FADS gene cluster, with allele frequencies differing between populations with historically plant-based versus animal-based diets. Some press coverage characterized the finding as showing that vegetarian diets raise disease risk; the authors publicly corrected this interpretation.

== Therapeutic foods for severe acute malnutrition ==
In 2015, Brenna and colleagues argued that the omega-6/omega-3 composition of ready-to-use therapeutic foods (RUTF) used to treat severe acute malnutrition was suboptimal for neurocognitive recovery. A subsequent triple-blind randomized trial in Malawian children, on which Brenna and Mark Manary were co-senior authors, reported that RUTF with reduced linoleic acid and added DHA improved cognitive outcomes measured six months after treatment.

In 2021, the Codex Committee on Nutrition and Foods for Special Dietary Uses considered essential fatty acid levels for its draft guideline on RUTF. A written submission by the Global Organization for EPA and DHA Omega-3s (GOED) cited the Malawi trial and recommended that DHA be permitted in RUTF. After an observer presented the trial's findings, the Committee lowered the maximum omega-6 level to 780 mg/100 kcal and raised the minimum omega-3 level to 110 mg/100 kcal, over a majority of written comments that had favored retaining the 2007 values. The guideline was adopted by the Codex Alimentarius Commission in 2022 as CXG 95-2022. Brenna attended the session as a GOED delegate. Cornell University credits his work with informing the Codex recommendations.

== Coconut oil ==
His comments in The New York Times on the healthfulness of coconut oil in 2015 and 2018 were widely reprinted. His laboratory subsequently reported that glycerol-derived process contaminants in refined coconut oil induce cholesterol synthesis in cultured liver cells.

== Reinforced lipids ==
Brenna and colleagues have developed bioanalytical methods to support chemical and biological studies of "reinforced lipids" (D-PUFAs), an approach under investigation for mitigating age-related neurological and retinal pathologies. These methods use the isotope mass signature of D-PUFAs to detect and monitor their incorporation into tissue. A mass spectrometry-based approach has also been developed to perform position-specific sequencing along the fatty acid chain, determining the extent of deuteration at each carbon position.

== Public policy ==
Brenna served as a subject-area expert consultant to the 2010 Dietary Guidelines Advisory Committee, and was a member of the 2015 Dietary Guidelines Advisory Committee, where he served on the Food Sustainability and Safety subcommittee whose sustainability recommendations were excluded from the final guidelines by Congress.

He was one of nine scientific review authors of The Scientific Foundation for the Dietary Guidelines for Americans, 2025–2030, the evidence report accompanying the 2025–2030 Dietary Guidelines released in January 2026. He was sole author of its Appendix 4.7, a systematic review of saturated fat intake, mortality, and cardiovascular outcomes. The final Guidelines retained the long-standing limit on saturated fat of less than 10% of daily calories, but also recommended higher protein intake, full-fat dairy, and butter or beef tallow as cooking fats, a combination that critics described as internally inconsistent, arguing that the recommended foods would make the 10% limit difficult or impossible to meet. Brenna had earlier co-authored a 2020 review in the Journal of the American College of Cardiology concluding that the available evidence did not support further limiting intake of saturated-fat-rich foods such as whole-fat dairy and unprocessed meat, and proposing food-based rather than nutrient-based recommendations.

He served on the 2010 FAO/WHO Expert Consultation on Fats and Fatty Acids in Human Nutrition.

== Expert testimony ==
Brenna was the United States Anti-Doping Agency's key scientific expert witness in its case against 2006 Tour de France winner Floyd Landis, testifying to the validity of carbon isotope ratio testing performed by the French national anti-doping laboratory at Châtenay-Malabry. The 2007 arbitration panel and the 2008 Court of Arbitration for Sport appeal both ruled against Landis, relying on that testimony; Landis was stripped of his title. Landis later admitted to doping and filed a False Claims Act suit against Lance Armstrong, which was settled.

== Awards and honors ==
- Robert H. Herman Memorial Award, American Society for Nutrition, 2013
- Osborne and Mendel Award, American Society for Nutrition, 2017; he is the fourth scientist to receive both awards
- Herbert J. Dutton Award, American Oil Chemists' Society (AOCS), 2020
- Ralph Holman Lifetime Achievement Award, AOCS, 2021
- Supelco/Nicholas Pelick AOCS Research Award, 2023
- Distinguished Fellow of the American Society for Nutrition (DFASN), Class of 2026
