= Rose Brenner =

American Jewish women's leader

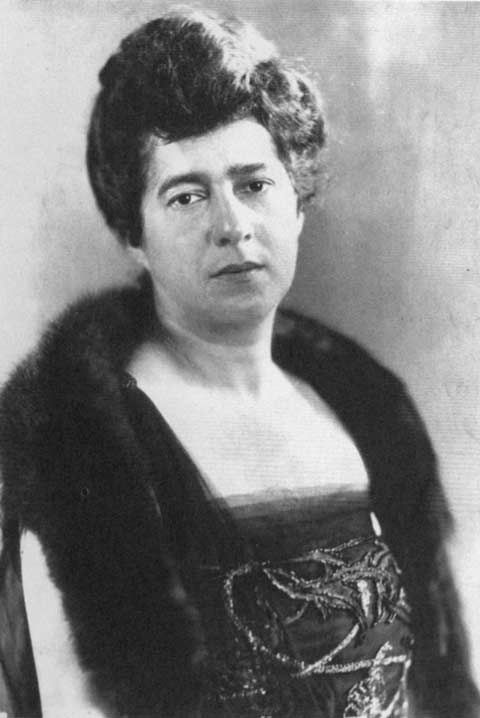
Rose Brenner

Rose Brenner (1884–1926) was an American women's leader and educator. From 1920 until her death, she headed the National Council of Jewish Women, raising membership from 28,000 to 50,000 and introducing specialized committees on foreign relations and post-war reconstruction. In particular, she established support for European refugees.

== Biography ==
Born on 3 April 1884 in Brooklyn, Rose Brenner, the eldest of six siblings, was the daughter of Judge Jacob Brenner and his wife Louise née Blumeneau. Her father played a leading role in local religious activities and politics. Brenner graduated in 1908 with a BA from Adelphi College.

She became active in the Brooklyn Section of the National Council of Jewish Women, serving as president from 1912 to 1918. She went on to become vice-president of the national council in 1915, later becoming national president in 1920. Under her leadership, the organization not only almost doubled membership but established a National Speakers Bureau and expanded its services for immigrant assistance. It also published Jewish prayer courses, including a prayer book in Braille. One of her main concerns was to provide support for Jewish immigrants in rural communities in the United States. As a result, in 1920 a Department of Farm and Rural Work was established.

In 1921, she also strengthened the organization by publishing The Jewish Woman, a quarterly, and the monthly The Immigrant. She set up services in support of refugees and created NCJW affiliates in Europe, caring for emigrants intending to go to America. Although she was unable to attend the First World Congress of Jewish Women in 1923 in Vienna, she sent a strong message of support through her representative Estelle Sternberger.

Brenner was also an active supporter of the Beth Elohim Temple where she taught for 20 years and chaired its sisterhood. She served as director of the Women's Foundation for Health under the Brooklyn Board of Education.

Rose Brenner died in Brooklyn of a stroke on 5 April 1926, aged only 42.
