= Helmut Brenner =

Austrian musicologist

Helmut Brenner (1 January 1957 in Mürzzuschlag, Austria – 17 February 2017) was an Austrian ethnomusicologist.

== Biography ==
=== Education ===
Brenner received music degrees in 1981 and 1984 at the Hochschule für Musik und darstellende Kunst in Graz, Austria, and earned a master's degree in history in 1993 and Ph.D. in musicology in 1995 at the University of Vienna, (Vienna, Austria).

=== Career ===
From 1987 to 2017 he was the professor and researcher at the Institut für Ethnomusikologie, Universität für Musik und darstellende Kunst, Graz, Austria. In addition, in 1998/99 and 2010 he was guest lecturer at the Leopold-Franzens-Universität, Innsbruck (Austria) and 1997-99 guest lecturer at the Universidad Nacional Autónoma de México (UNAM) in Mexico City. In 2000/01 he has been engaged as a UNESCO consultant for a multilateral marimba project with eleven participating Latin America countries within the program Patrimoine Oral e Immatériel de l'Humanité. There he managed as field consultant a multilateral marimba-project in Mexico, Guatemala, Belize, El Salvador, Honduras, Costa Rica, Nicaragua, Cuba, Colombia, Ecuador and Brazil.

From 2002 to 2009 he was also professor at the musicological institute of the Saarland University in Saarbrücken, Germany and since 2009 guest professor at the Universidad de Ciencias y Artes de Chiapas in Tuxtla Gutiérrez (Mexico). In 2004 he earned his postdoctoral lecture qualification (Venia legendi/Habilitation) in ethnomusicology and popular music research at the Saarland University (Germany) with a professorial dissertation (Habilitationsschrift) on Marimbas in Latin America.

=== Latin American music ethnomusicologist ===
Brenner was one of only few ethnomusicologists from the German-speaking world dedicated to Latin American music, as well as to traditional and popular music.

== Death ==
Brenner died on 17 February 2017.

== Publications ==
- Stimmt an das Lied... Das große österreichische Arbeitersänger-Buch, Graz: Leykam, 1986.
- (Ed.): Beiträge zur Erforschung und Pflege der Volksmusik in Baden-Württemberg : Referate des Volksmusik-Symposiums in Ochsenhausen vom 23. - 27. Mai 1990; Der Musikant, Sonderband / Landesmusikrat Baden-Württemberg, Karlsruhe 1990. Permalink Deutsche Nationalbibliothek
- Musik als Waffe? Theorie und Praxis der politischen Musikverwendung, dargestellt am Beispiel der Steiermark 1938 – 45, Graz: Herbert Weishaupt Verlag, 1992.
- (together with Wolfgang Nagele and Andrea Pühringer): Im Schatten des Phönix. Höhen und Tiefen eines dominierenden Industriebetriebes und deren Auswirkungen auf die Region, Gnas: Herbert Weishaupt Verlag, 1993.
- Música ranchera. Das mexikanische Äquivalent zur Country and Western Music aus historischer, musikalischer und kommerzieller Sicht (=Musikethnologische Sammelbände 14), Tutzing: Hans Scheider, 1996.
- Gehundsteh Herzsoweh. Erzherzog-Johann-Liedtraditionen vor, in, neben und nach „Wo i geh und steh“, Mürzzuschlag: Kulturkreis Ars Styriae Erzherzog Johann, 1996.
- Juventino Rosas: His Life, His Work, His Time (=Detroit Monographs in Musicology/Studies in Music 32), Warren, Michigan, USA: Harmonie Park Press, 2000.
- (Ed.): Damit sie nicht verloren gehen. Singtraditionen in der Veitsch, Veitsch-Graz-Saarbrücken: Lichtenstern, 2007; 2nd edition Veitsch-Graz-Saarbrücken: Lichtenstern, 2009.
- Marimbas in Lateinamerika. Historische Fakten und Status quo der Marimbatraditionen in Mexiko, Guatemala, Belize, Honduras, El Salvador, Nicaragua, Costa Rica, Kolumbien, Ecuador und Brasilien (=Studien und Materialien zur Musikwissenschaft 43), Hildesheim–Zürich–New York: Georg Olms Verlag, 2007.
- (together with Daniel Fuchsberger, Ed.): Damit sie nicht verloren gehen. Singtraditionen in Eisenerz, Hieflau, Radmer und Vordernberg, Eisenerz: Cool-Dur, 2012.
- (together with José Israel Moreno Vázquez and Juan Alberto Bermúdez Molina, Ed.): Voces de la Sierra. Marimbas sencillas en Chiapas (=Sonidos de la tierra. Estudios de etnomusicología 1), Graz-Tuxtla Gutiérrez:KUG-UNICACH, 2014. ISBN 978-607-8240-59-3.
- (together with Juan Alberto Bermúdez Molina, Lisa-Christina Fellner and Kurt Schatz): LiedSammlerVolk. Volksliedsammler und -sammlerinnen in der Steiermark, Steirisches Volksliedwerk, Graz 2016, ISBN 978-3-902516-33-6.
