= Anthony Brenner =

Canadian-born German ice hockey player

- Born: November 28, 1959 (age 66) Calgary, Alberta, Canada
- Height: 6 ft 1 in (185 cm)
- Weight: 185 lb (84 kg; 13 st 3 lb)
- Position: Forward
- Shot: Left
- Played for: Deggendorf Fire; Düsseldorfer EG; Krefeld Pinguine; SV Bayreuth; EC Bad Tölz; Straubing Tigers
- NHL draft: Undrafted
- Playing career: 1980–1998

Anthony Brenner (born November 28, 1959) is a Canadian-born German former ice hockey player. Brenner is currently the head coach for the Deggendorfer SC U16 team.

Brenner played 18 seasons of professional hockey in Germany. He began his coaching career during the 2010–11 season as the head coach of the Deggendorfer SC U16 squad.
