= Janis Brenner =

American choreographer

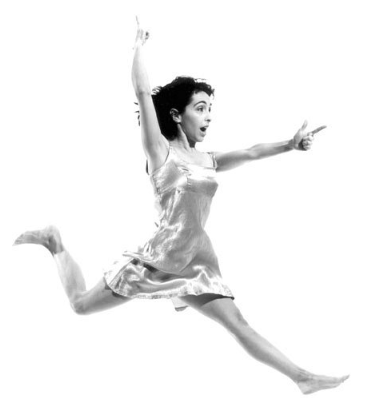

Background information
- Born: New York City, United States
- Occupation: Singer • Dancer

Janis Brenner is an American dance artist, choreographer, and singer. She is the Artistic Director of Janis Brenner & Dancers in New York City.

== Biography ==
Brenner has performed internationally in the field of contemporary dance. Her honors include a 1997 New York Dance & Performance Award, otherwise known as the Bessie Awards, for her work in Meredith Monk’s The Politics of Quiet and the Lester Horton Award for Choreography from the Dance Resource Center in Los Angeles. Her work has been supported by organizations including the NY Foundation for the Arts, the Fund for US Artists at International Festivals, the U.S. State Department, Asian Cultural Council, The Trust for Mutual Understanding, UNESCO, and US embassies in Moscow, Jakarta, and Dakar. She has also received a commission for the interdisciplinary work, The Memory Project, from the Whitney Museum of American Art at Philip Morris.

From 1990 to 2005, Brenner performed with Meredith Monk & Vocal Ensemble and continues to present several of Monk's solo works. She received her Master of Fine Arts degree in Dance from the Hollins University/American Dance Festival graduate program in 2009. She was a faculty member of The Juilliard School until 2021, serving as a choreographic mentor for the Choreographers & Composers' course, and teaching creative process. Brenner was on the board of The Gender Project in NY and is on the advisory board of The Yard in Chilmark, Massachusetts. In May 2006, Brenner was inducted into the Farmingdale High School "Wall of Fame" on Long Island as an honored alumna.

She is current part of the faculty of Marymount Manhattan College and at STEPS Conservatory.

== Choreography ==
Brenner's collection of works includes:

Piece	Year	Ref
Anima	1981	
Primadonna	1981	
Morning Dance	1981	
Guilt	1985	
Inviolentimes	1985	
Small Town Girl?	1985	
Still There	1987	
Suspicions	1987	
Pieces of Trust	1989	
Anticipation	1989	
The Shekhinah/Voices	1989	
Liquid Sand/Current Winds	1989	
Remains and Remembered	1990	
Non Sinatra Songs	1991	
Pieces of Trust (duet version)	1991	
Layers	1992	
Plateau #2	1993	
Ton of Led	1994	
The Memory of All That	1994	
Shun-Woa (Original title: Uzu Maki)	1994/2007	
A Matter of Time	1995	
About Bob / What About Bob	1996	
On the Rim of Thought	1998	
Heart STRINGS	1998	
Under Renovation	1998	
The Memory of All That: Part I, Part II	1999	
The L Word	2000	
A "Peace" for Women	2000–2001	
The Last Ones	2001	
Common Ground	2001	
The Gender Project: Women Hitting the Wall	2001	
Contents May Have Shifted...	2002	
Lake	2004	
Laugh/Cry	2004	
The Sound of Moving	2006	
Natashka's Tanze	2006	
Room	2006	
The Awkward Stage	2007	
Lost, Found, Lost	2007	
Paradise Songs	2008	
Corporeal Rupture	2008	
Dancing in Absentia	2009	
A Delicate Case	2010	
Dance from the Heart: Men	2010	
she was not needing to be changing	2018	
Inheritance: A Litany	2022	
She Remembers Her Amnesia	2022	
Interesting Women (final scene only)	2025	
The Memory Project	Ongoing	

== Awards ==
- 1986 – New York Dance On Camera Festival award.
- 1993 – Richard Porter Leach Fellowship for the Arts from SUNY Empire State College.
- 1996 – Lester Horton Award for Outstanding Achievement in Choreography for the collaborative work "Tom's Renaissance".
- 1997 – New York Dance and Performance Award (Bessie Award) for Outstanding Creative Achievement in Meredith Monk's work "The Politics of Quiet".
- 1999 – New York Dance and Performance Nomination (Bessie nomination) for her performance in "Solo for Janis" choreographed by Richard Siegal.
- 2017 – Best Choreography Award for Eva Petric's Eden, transplanted at United Solo Theatre Festival
- 2018 – Best Production Award for Inheritance: A Litany at the United Solo Theatre Festival Off-Broadway
- 2019 – "Critic's Choice" Award from All About Solo Critics' Award for Inheritance: A Litany at the United Solo Theatre Festival Off-Broadway
- Copperfoot Award for Lost, Found, Lost at Wayne State University

== Collaborators ==
- In 1984, Brenner appeared in The Tales of Cri Cri: with Placido Domingo, Mireille Mathieu and Ofelia Medina, created Miguel Alemán, with composer Francisco Gabilondo Soler, and director Federico Weingartshofer.
- From 1990 to 2005, Brenner has performed with Meredith Monk & Vocal Ensemble. She continues to perform a vocal suite from Monk's "Songs from the Hill" in concert.
- She and Theo Bleckmann recorded their work "Mars Cantata" in 1997.
- In 1998 she appeared in Too Much On My Plate with choreographer Claire Porter.
- She was also a co-choreographer for Michael Moschen and a soloist with Annabelle Gamson's company, performing historic repertory of Mary Wigman and Isadora Duncan (1984–87).
- Brenner worked with Rudolf Nureyev, Plácido Domingo, the Dave Brubeck Quartet, Joseph Papp, the Batsheva Dance Company in Israel, and Alwin Nikolais when she was a soloist with the Murray Louis Dance Company (1977–84).
