= Leo Brecht =

German organizational theorist

Leo Brecht (born 1962) is a German organizational theorist, consultant, and professor at the University of Liechtenstein. He is known for his work on business process redesign.

== Life and work ==
Brecht received his MA in Economics and Mathematics at Ulm University in 1988, his PhD in Applied Statistics at the University of Konstanz in 1992, and his habilitation in 1999 at the University of St. Gallen.

After graduation Brecht started his career as consultant for the international Information Management Group in 1993. In 1997 he moved to Andersen Business Consulting in Switzerland where he became senior manager and in 2002 managing director. In 2003 he moved to Arthur D. Little, where he became managing partner.

Since 1993 Brecht was also lecturer at the University of St. Gallen. In 2007 he was also appointed Professor at the University of St. Gallen, and in 2008 also at Ulm University and Managing Director of the Institute of Process and Technology Management. Since 2018 Brecht is Professor for Entrepreneurship and Technology at the University of Liechtenstein.

== Selected publications ==
Brecht has published several books and articles:

- Hess, Thomas, and Leo Brecht. State of the art des Business process redesign: Darstellung und Vergleich bestehender Methoden. Gabler, 1995.
- Bach, Volker, Leo Brecht, and Hubert Österle. Marktstudie Software-Tools für das Business Process Redesign. FBO-Verlag, 1995.
- Hubert Österle, Leo Brecht and Thomas Hess. Enabling Systematic Business Change: Integrated Methods and Software Tools for Business Process Redesign. Vieweg, Wiesbaden 1996.
