= Brenneman =

Brenneman may refer to:

- Amy Brenneman (born 1964), American actress, writer, and producer
- Charlie Brenneman (born 1981), American mixed martial artist
- Daniel Brenneman (1834–1919), American Mennonite minister and church leader
- Greg Brenneman (born 1961), American businessman
- John Brenneman (born 1943), Canadian former professional ice hockey player
- Linda Brenneman (born 1965), American road cyclist
- Ron Brenneman (born 1947), Canadian oilman
