= Jacob Brenner =

Jewish-American lawyer and judge

Jacob Brenner (April 8, 1857 – October 16, 1921) was a Jewish-American lawyer and judge from New York.

== Life ==
Brenner was born on April 8, 1857, in New York City, New York, the son of Simon Brenner and Caroline Alexander. He attended public schools in Brooklyn. His father was a German immigrant with a tailoring establishment in Brooklyn.

Brenner studied law in the office of Smith & Woodward, studying under former Surrogate and Brigadier-General Jesse C. Smith. He was then admitted to the bar, and at different points served as counsel of the Brooklyn Excise Department and the Sheriff of Kings County. In 1891, he became a partner in the law firm Bearns and Brenner. In 1893, he was appointed counsel to the Brooklyn Police Department and held that position through two administrations. He was appointed city magistrate in 1897, making him the first Brooklyn Jew to hold a judicial position. He resigned as magistrate in 1902, when he became commissioner of jurors of Kings County. He served as commissioner until his death.

Brenner was active in the Republican Party, and was considered the leader of the Eighth Assembly District. He served as executive member from his ward for 34 years. Due to his length of service, he became the dean of the New York Republican State Committee. He was a member of the Kings County Republican Committee for 24 years and chairman of its Executive Committee for four terms. He was a delegate to every Republican State Convention since 1881, and was a delegate to multiple Republican National Conventions.

Brenner was a member of the Freemasons, the Royal Arch Masonry, the Royal Arch Masonry, the Brooklyn Club, the Montauk Club, the Unity Club, and the Federal Republican Club of Kings County. He was president of Congregation Beth Elohim from 1907 to 1921 and served as superintendent of its religious school for 35 years. In 1883, he married Louise Blumenau. His children were Mortimer, Arthur, Rose, Rica, Selma, and Caroline. His sons were both lawyers. His daughter Rose Brenner was president of the National Council of Jewish Women.

Brenner died from heart disease while presiding at a meeting of the board of trustees of Congregation Beth Elohim. Rabbi Alexander Lyons delivered the eulogy for his funeral at the Congregation. Among those who attended the funeral were New York Supreme Court Justices Stephen Callaghan, Leander B. Faber, James Van Siclen, Lewis L. Fawcett, James C. Cropsey, and Charles H. Kelby, former Justice Luke Stapleton, former Chief Judge of the New York Court of Appeals Edgar M. Cullen, Republican-Coalition mayoral candidate Henry H. Curran, Surrogate George A. Wingate, Senator William M. Calder, Borough President Edward J. Riegelmann, Queens Republican leader Joseph H. DeBragga, Manhattan Republican leader Samuel S. Koenig, Brooklyn's Republican district leaders, Congregation Beth Elohim trustees (including District Attorney Harry E. Lewis, Meier Steinbrink, and Manasseh Miller), representations from the Federal Club the 8th Assembly District (Brenner's district) and the Congregation Beth Elohim Sunday School and women's auxiliary, and delegations from the Bedford Avenue Temple, the Unity Club, the Council of Jewish Women (which his daughter Rose was the national president of), and women political leaders from the various districts. He was buried in Mount Neboh Cemetery in Cypress Hills.
