= Paolo Brenner =

German cardiac surgeon

Paolo Brenner (born 21 May 1966, in Höchstädt an der Donau) is a German physician and a professor of cardiac surgery at the Department of Cardiac Surgery, Klinikum Großhadern of LMU Munich. He is known for his work in the fields of xenotransplantation, the advancement of artificial hearts, extracorporeal membrane oxygenation (ECMO) and lung transplantation.

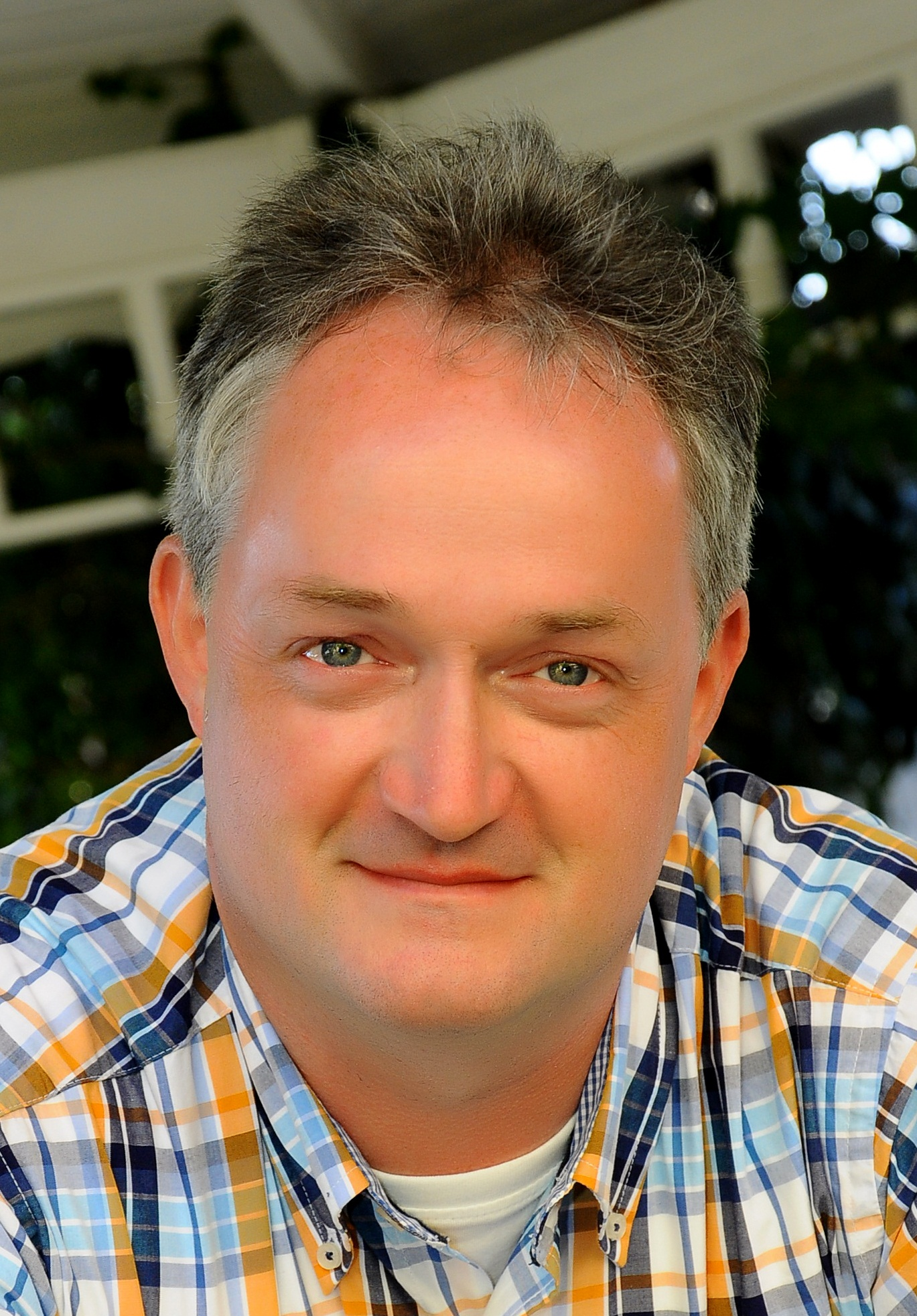
Paolo Brenner

== Biography ==
As an adolescent, Brenner was a co-founder of the Deutsche Gesellschaft für Kosmologie (DGK). He was editor and co-publisher of the Zeitschrift für Kosmologie 1990–2007. In this function, he was driven by his own physical research paper (1985) titled "The biography of fixed stars" and by his work at Jugend forscht about black holes and published several own papers and surveys about cosmological subjects (1986).

== Scientific contribution ==
Since 1993, Brenner has dealt with topics of thoracic organ transplantation and, since 2004, as a transplant surgeon of heart and lung transplantation. Since 2006, he has been a member of the Munich Lung Transplant Group and from 2000 has been an explant surgeon of the German Organ Transplantation Foundation (Deutsche Stiftung Organtransplantation (DSO)). In 1993, he was a junior operator of the former Baxter Novacor Company for the wearable artificial heart system Novacor and researched at last as a proctor of JarvikHeart in co-operation with Robert Jarvik developing a new miniaturized “valve axial pump”. Supported by the Bavarian Research Foundation (Bayerische Forschungsstiftung, grant 219/96) together with his research team as a consultant of cardiac surgery he investigated the xenogeneic transplantation of multi-transgenic pig hearts as a possible future organ replacement therapy in man since 1997. Since 2004 he worked within the scope of a Transregio Research Group FOR 535 of the German Research Foundation (Deutsche Forschungsgemeinschaft (DFG)) and since 2012 as a principal investigator for the sector of xenogeneic heart transplantation of the Transregio Research Collaborative Research Centre 127 (Transregio-Sonderforschungbereich SFB 127) with the speaker Bruno Reichart in the Walter-Brendel-Center of experimental medicine (WBex). Cardiac xenotransplantation (from pig to man), which was studied by Brenner and Reichart since 1997, has reached a preclinical status despite a higher immunological complexity than allotransplantation due to preexisting and new-built antibodies against whole organs. Using a patented combination (EP 1181034 B1, EP 1980263A1, US 8,435,520 B2) consisting of transgenic organs/cells and immunoadsorption (elimination of antibodies from the recipient) and a special combination of immunosuppressive drugs hyperacute and delayed xenograft rejection should be prevented and long-term survival of a xenograft should be enabled and realized. In times of massively increasing shortage of donor organs and yet major problems with artificial hearts (cable connections, batteries, strokes and infections) this makes xenotransplantation highly interesting in the area of organ/cell transplantation. By using an almost unlimited source of porcine organs (heart, kidney, lung, cornea, (liver rather improbably) and cells (pig islet cells) against diabetes, nigrostriatal brain cells against Morbus Parkinson, stem cells, bone/-marrow, skin etc.) not only in Europe, but also worldwide many people could be helped with animal cells or with the replacement of a whole organ. In view of 45 original papers, over 110 national and international oral presentations, two highly prized international research awards and as an advising tutor of 20 postdocs and postgraduates, Brenner did pioneer work and substantially contributed to the scientific progress of the LMU, especially due to his know-how in the area of xenotransplantation and mechanical circulatory support systems. Brenner can be classified as an international expert for mechanical and “biological” heart replacement, wherefore he also owns patents (for example). In his teaching activity since 2004 Brenner was involved in the introduction of the practical MECUM student educational program of the LMU oriented to the Harvard-University concept. Since 2007 he was the responsible organizing associate lecturer for the compartment of cardiac surgery of the LMU and since 2011 deputy speaker of the cardiovascular educational block of the new medical student education system Modul 23 of the LMU. As the leader of the cardiac surgical advanced training program he organized about 400 specialist and scientific qualification performances mostly as from the Bayerische Landesärztekammer certificated Monday education for consultant training and professional development since 2003.

Novel research focuses and interests of Brenner are miniaturized artificial hearts in heart valves (in cooperation with Robert Jarvik), inhibition of aging enzymes, cryonic, energy and environment technology (e.g. e-mobility), essential oils as well as ebola.

== Awards ==
- "Young Investigator's Award of European Association for Cardio-Thoracic Surgery" for his work The influence of antibody and complement removal with a Ig-Therasorb column in a xenogeneic working heart model (Brussels, Sep. 20–23, 1998, 12th Ann. Meeting of the EACTS)
- "Biotest Award of the European Society for Organ Transplantation" for his presentation Influence of ischemic time on hyperacute xenograft rejection of pig hearts in a working heart perfusion model with human blood (Oslo, June 24, 1999, 9th Congress of the European Society for Organ Transplantation (ESOT))

== Academic memberships ==
Medical associations:

- Transplantation Society (TTS),
- International Xenotransplantation Association (IXA)
- Principal Investigator of the Transregio Research Collaborative Research Centre (Sonderforschungsbereich) Transregio-SFB 127 Xenotransplantation of the German Research Foundation (Deutsche Forschungsgemeinschaft, DFG) with the subject Biology of xenogeneic cell and organ transplantation
- Member of the Deutsche Gesellschaft für Thorax-, Herz- und Gefäßchirurgie
- Member of the advisory board of Immunapheresis in Solid Organ Transplantation
- Explanteur of DSO
- Proctor of the artificial heart manufacturer JarvikheartTM (New York, USA)
- Member of the Stiftungsrat des Christlichen Entwicklungsdienstes (CED)

Other academic associations

- Cofounder of the Deutsche Gesellschaft für Kosmologie (1986 bis 2007)

== Editorial Boards and Reviewer ==
Medical journals:

- International Journal of artificial organs (IJAO)
- German Research Foundation (Deutsche Forschungsgemeinschaft)
- Xenotransplantation

Other journals:

- Editor of Zeitschrift für Kosmologie (1986 - 2008),

== Patents: International patens and US-patents ==
- Publication of the international patents titled: „Combinations of immunosuppressive agents for the treatment or prevention of graft rejection„/ „Organic Compounds“ (International Application Number: PCT/EP00/04250 und International Publication Number WO 00/67773 A3, filing number 00927193.3), granted 21.7.2010 as European patent with the number 1181034.
- US-Patent "Combination of immunosuppressive agents for the treatment or prevention of graft rejection" (US 2002/0132764 A1 (filing number 11/599814), 3/2013 granted as US-Patent: US 8,435,520 B2.y

== Publications ==
- Publications ResearchGate
- Publications Microsoft Academic Search
- Publications PubMed

== Political activity ==
The community of Neuried elected Brenner as a deputy chairman of the Christian Social Union in Bavaria in the local council and the building and environment committee. in 2014.
