= Ali Sunyaev =

Professor for computer science

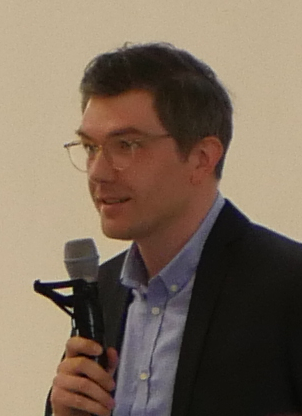
Sunyaev Ali

Ali Sunyaev (Russian: Али́ Раши́дович Сюня́ев, Ali Rashidowitsch Sjunjajew; born June 11, 1981, in Moscow, USSR) is a professor for computer science and vice president at the Technical University of Munich (TUM), TUM Campus Heilbronn.

== Life ==
His father is Rashid Sunyaev (reputable cosmologist and director of the Max Planck Institute for Astrophysics). His mother Gyuzal Sunyaeva is a physician. His brother Shamil Sunyaev is Distinguished Chair Professor for genetics at the Harvard Medical School at the Harvard University. Due to the work of his father, his family moved from the Russian Federation to Germany in 1996.

Ali Sunyaev studied computer science at the Technical University of Munich (TUM) from 2000 to 2005. In 2005, he joined the graduate school of the Institute of Computer Science at the Technical University of Munich to do his PhD in computer science and information systems on the topic 'Design and Application of a Security Analysis Method for Healthcare Telematics in Germany. From 2010 to 2016, he was assistant professor for information systems and information systems quality at the University of Cologne in Germany. From 2016 to December 2017, he was full professor for information systems and systems development and director of the Research Center for Information Systems Design at the University of Kassel in Germany. Subsequently, Ali Sunyaev was full professor for computer science and director of the Institute of Applied Informatics and Formal Description Methods at the Karlsruhe Institute of Technology (KIT) from January 2018 to September 2024. Since October 2024, he is professor for Information Infrastructures at the TUM School of Computation, Information, and Technology (CIT) (vice president of TUM (TUM Campus Heilbronn).

In 2009 and 2012, Ali Sunyaev was a guest researcher at the Harvard-MIT Division of Health Sciences and Technology, Intelligent Health Lab, Harvard School of Engineering and Applied Sciences, Boston, Massachusetts, USA. In 2011, he was a guest lecturer at the Higher School of Economics (HSE) in Moscow. Since 2024 Sunyaev is a member of the scientific council of the DFG (German Research Foundation), a member of the board of directors of the German Informatics Society (GI), and a member of the DFG-funded Karlsruhe Decision & Design Lab (KD²Lab).

== Research ==
Ali Sunyaev conducts research on the design, use, and societal interactions of internet technologies. His main research interests include development of innovative health IT, cloud computing services, distributed ledger technologies, trustworthy artificial intelligence, and information security management.

Ali Sunyaev leads multiple research projects funded by funding bodies such as the Helmholtz Association of German Research Centres, and the German Research Foundation (Deutsche Forschungsgemeinschaft).

His work has been published in leading international scientific outlets in computer science, information systems, medical informatics, and economics and is featured in a variety of media outlets.
