= Gaboltov =

- Municipality
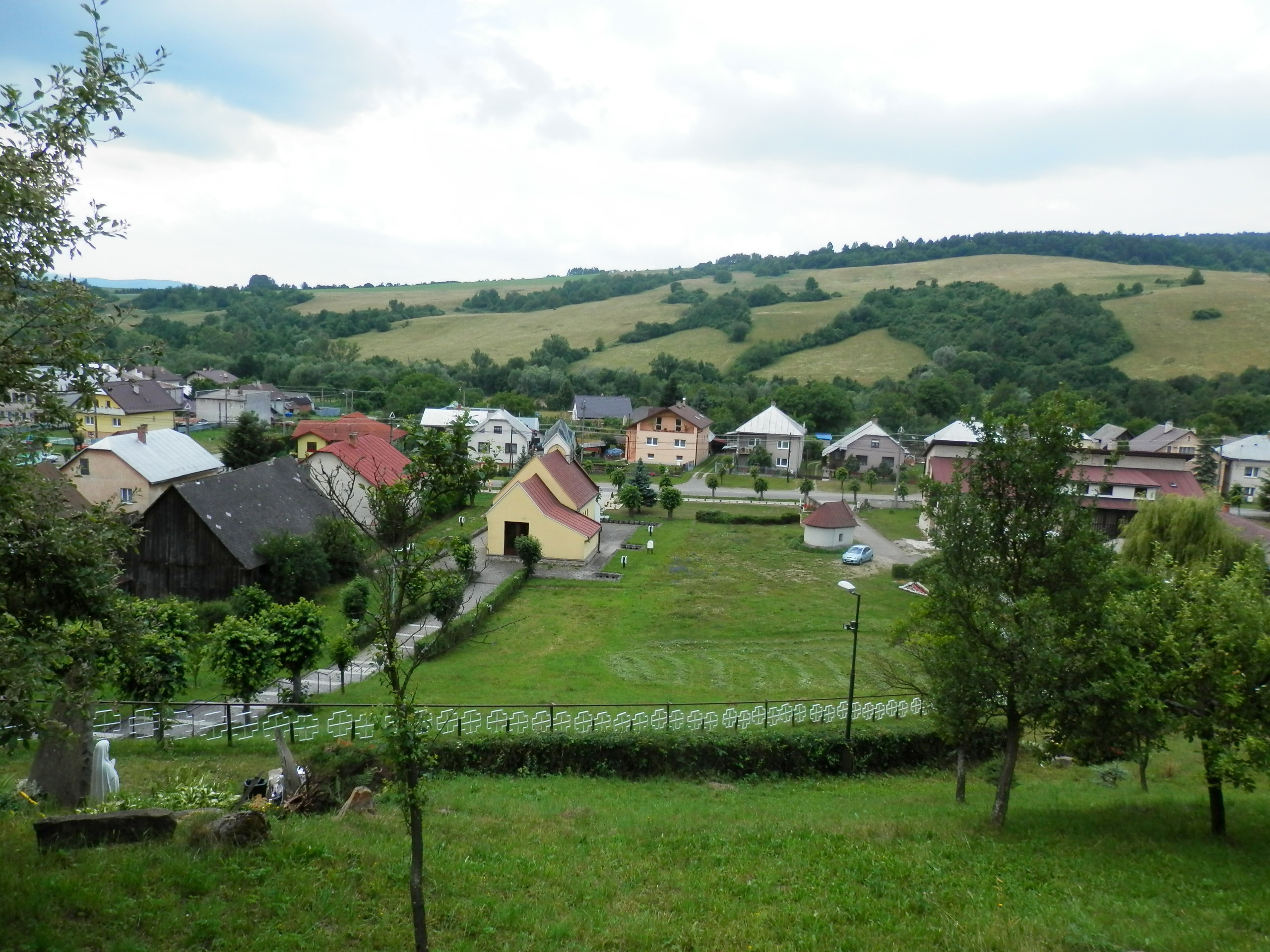

- Flag

- Location of Gaboltov in the Prešov Region Location of Gaboltov in Slovakia
- Coordinates: 49.37°N 21.15°E
- Country: Slovakia
- Region: Prešov Region
- District: Bardejov District
- First mentioned: 1247

Area
  - Total: 12.73 km^{2} (4.92 sq mi)
- Elevation: 410 m (1,350 ft)

Population (2025)
  - Total: 538
- Time zone: UTC+1 (CET)
  - Summer (DST): UTC+2 (CEST)
- Postal code: 860 2
- Area code: +421 54
- Vehicle registration plate (until 2022): BJ
- Website: www.gaboltov.sk

Gaboltov (Rusyn: Ґабултів, romanized: Gabultiv, Hungarian: Galbatő) is a village and municipality in Bardejov District in the Prešov Region of north-east Slovakia.

== History ==
In historical records, the village was first mentioned in 1247.

== Geography ==
The municipality lies at an altitude of 410 metres (1,350 ft) and covers an area of 12.73 km^{2} (4.92 sq mi) (2025).

== Population ==
Population statistic (10 years)
Year	1995	2005	2015	2025
Count	511	516	510	538
Difference		+0.97%	−1.16%	+5.49%

Population statistic
Year	2024	2025
Count	528	538
Difference		+1.89%

It has a population of 538 people (31 December 2025).

=== Ethnicity ===
Census 2021 (1+ %)
Ethnicity	Number	Fraction
Slovak	478	97.15%
Not found out	13	2.64%
Rusyn	10	2.03%
Total	492	

In year 2021 was 492 people by ethnicity 478 as Slovak, 13 as Not found out, 10 as Rusyn, 4 as Romani, 3 as Ukrainian, 2 as Polish, 2 as Other, 1 as Czech, 1 as Irish and 1 as Russian.

Note on population: The difference values of population numbers in the table "Population statistic" and in the sections "Ethnicity" & "Religion" is caused by the use of various statistical methods.

=== Religion ===
Census 2021 (1+ %)
Religion	Number	Fraction
Roman Catholic Church	415	84.35%
Greek Catholic Church	34	6.91%
Eastern Orthodox Church	14	2.85%
None	11	2.24%
Not found out	10	2.03%
Evangelical Church	5	1.02%
Total	492	

In year 2021 was 492 people by religion 415 from Roman Catholic Church, 34 from Greek Catholic Church, 14 from Eastern Orthodox Church, 11 from None, 10 from Not found out, 5 from Evangelical Church, 1 from Calvinist Church, 1 from Other and not ascertained christian church and 1 from Ad hoc movements.

== Genealogical resources ==
The records for genealogical research are available at the state archive "Statny Archiv in Presov, Slovakia"

- Roman Catholic church records (births/marriages/deaths): 1800-1895 (parish A)
- Greek Catholic church records (births/marriages/deaths): 1827-1934 (parish B)

== See also ==
- List of municipalities and towns in Slovakia
