= Brenner Lucas =

Brazilian footballer

Personal information
- Full name: Brenner Lucas Gonçalves Santos
- Date of birth: January 2, 2002 (age 24)
- Place of birth: Monte Alegre de Minas, Brazil
- Height: 1.71 m (5 ft 7 1/2 in)
- Position: Right winger

Team information
- Current team: Santa Clara
- Number: 11

Youth career
- Taubaté
- 2017–2019: Atlético Mineiro
- 2019–2020: Shorin Global

Senior career*
Years	Team	Apps	(Gls)
2020–2021	Taubaté	13	(2)
2021–2022	Bahia	2	(0)
2022–2024	Estrela da Amadora	0	(0)
2024	→ União de Leiria (loan)	6	(0)
2024–2025	Alverca	33	(3)
2025–	Santa Clara	33	(2)
- * Club domestic league appearances and goals as of 20:03, 20 September 2026 (UTC)

Brenner Lucas Gonçalves Santos (born 2 January 2002), known as Brenner Lucas or just Brenner, is a Brazilian footballer who plays as a right winger for Santa Clara in the Primeira Liga.

== Early career ==
Brenner Lucas is a product of the Brazilian clubs Taubaté and Atlético Mineiro before moving to the Japanese club Shoring Global. He returned to Brazil in 2020 where he began his senior career with Taubaté and Bahia. In 2022, he joined the Portuguese club Estrela da Amadora where he was assigned to their reserves. On 31 January 2024, he joined União de Leiria on a year-long loan in the Liga Portugal 2. On 17 July 2024, he moved to Alverca. On 27 February 2025, he moved to Primeira Liga club Santa Clara on a 3-year contract.

== Career statistics ==
As of match played 20 September 2026

Appearances and goals by club, season and competition
Club	Season	League			State league		National cup		League Cup		Continental		Total	
Club	Season	Division	Apps	Goals	Apps	Goals	Apps	Goals	Apps	Goals	Apps	Goals	Apps	Goals
Taubaté	2021	Campeonato Paulista Série A2	0	0	13	2	—		—		—		13	2
Bahia	2022	Campeonato Baiano	0	0	2	0	—		—		—		2	0
Estrela da Amadora	2023–24	Primeira Liga	0	0	—		0	0	—		—		0	0
União de Leiria (loan)	2023–24	Liga Portugal 2	6	0	—		0	0	—		—		6	0
Alverca	2024–25	Liga Portugal 2	33	3	—		3	0	—		—		36	3
Santa Clara	2025–26	Primeira Liga	28	0	—		3	0	1	0	4 (Note: Appearances in UEFA Conference League)	0	37	0
Santa Clara	2026–27	Primeira Liga	5	2	—		0	0	0	0	—		5	2
Santa Clara	Total		33	2	—		3	0	1	0	4	0	42	2
Career total			72	5	15	2	6	0	1	0	4	0	99	7
