= Eduard Brenner =

German linguist (1888–1970)

Johann Wilhelm Eduard Brenner (October 4, 1888 – January 16, 1970) was a professor of English at the University of Erlangen. From 1951 to 1954, he had been state secretary in the Bavarian State Ministry of Education and Culture.

== Biography ==
Brenner was born in Munich, studied philosophy and modern languages at the universities of Munich and Würzburg and earned his PhD degree from the University of Würzburg. From 1913 to 1914, he was working on the New English Dictionary (Vol. 8) in Oxford. After the World War he taught as lecturer at the University of Erlangen and the College of Economics and Social Sciences in Nuremberg which got university status in 1930. In 1925, Brenner became director of the adult education center (Volkshochschule) Nuremberg and one year later Professor of English at the College in Nuremberg. In 1927 he founded the German-English Cultural Office for academic exchange in London and became its director until 1929, when he was member of the executive committee of the World Federation for Adult Education until 1933. The Nuremberg college became Hindenburg University in 1933. Brenner was dismissed by the National Socialists. In 1934, he made a lecture tour through the United States.

After the end of the second World War Brenner became professor of English and rector of the University of Nuremberg in 1945. One year later he became rector at the University of Erlangen. Brenner served in both rectorates until 1948 (the universities merged in 1961). In 1948, the chair of American cultural history was created for him. Brenner taught until 1955 when he retired. He was honored by the University of Nuremberg with the title of an Ehrensenator in 1955.

Brenner died in Oberaudorf on January 16, 1970 at age 81. He was survived by his wife, formerly Luise Jacob, and his son Peter.

== Politician ==
Brenner became member of the Social Democratic Party (SPD). From 1924 to 1926, he was member of the Erlangen city council and after the war member of the city council in Nuremberg. From 1951 to 1954, he served for his party as state secretary in the Bavarian State Ministry of Education and Culture under the government of Hans Ehard (CSU).

Later he joined the Deutsche Friedens Union (DFU, German union for peace) and became the Bavarian top candidate in the federal election in 1961. However his efforts were unsuccessful.

== Selected works ==
- Thomas Phaer, mit besonderer Berücksichtigung seiner Aeneis-Übersetzung (1558) nebst Neudruck des 6. Buches (Winter, Heidelberg 1913)
- Volksbildung als Volksbildung (E. Fromann & Sohn, Nürnberg 1930)
- Abraham Lincoln (Dipax, Erlangen 1948)
- Betrachtungen zur schottischen Erziehungsgeschichte (Universitätsbibliothek, Erlangen 1962)
