= Ropa, Lesser Poland Voivodeship =

Ropa
- Village
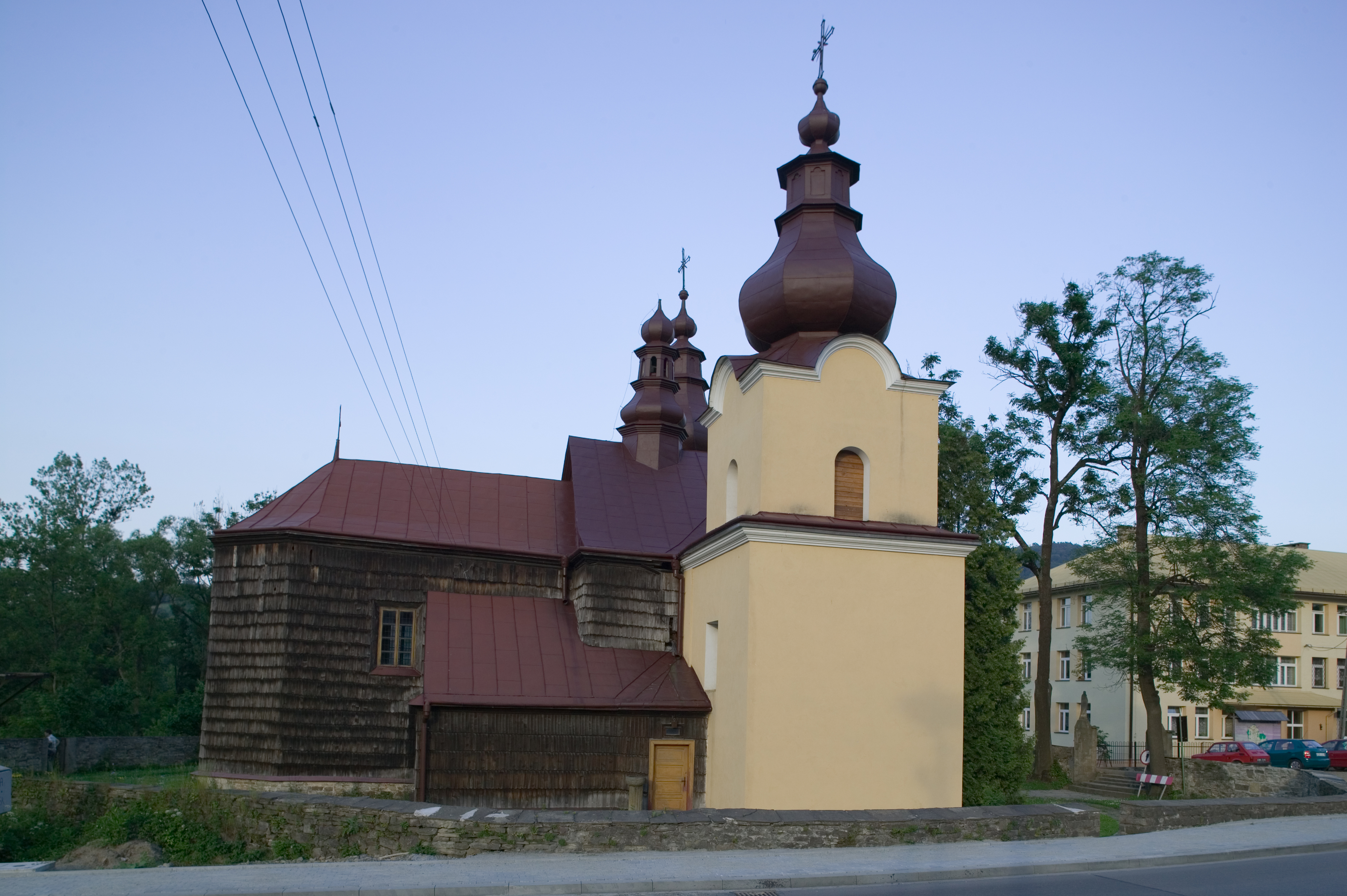

- Location within Poland
- Coordinates: 49°36′N 21°3′E
- Country: Poland
- Voivodeship: Lesser Poland
- County: Gorlice
- Gmina: Ropa
- Population: 3,697

Ropa [ˈrɔpa] is a village in Gorlice County, Lesser Poland Voivodeship, in southern Poland. It is the seat of the gmina (administrative district) called Gmina Ropa.
