= Walter Brenner (computer scientist) =

Swiss computer scientist and academic

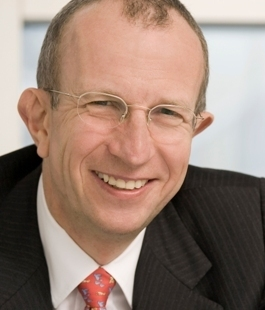
Walter Brenner (2010)

Walter Hermann Brenner (born 21 June 1958) is a Swiss academic, Professor of Information Management and Executive Director of the Institute for computer science of the University of St. Gallen.

== Biography ==
Brenner studied Business Administration at the University of St. Gallen, where he subsequently became research assistant to Hubert Österle and in 1985 received his PhD.

From 1985 to 1989A Brenner was employed at Alusuisse Lonza AG, where he ended up as director of application development. From 1989 to 1993 he was director of the research program "Information Management in 2000" at the Institute of Computer Science at the University of St. Gallen. From 1993 to 1999 he was Professor of Business Administration and Information Management at the Freiberg University of Mining and Technology. Subsequently, in 1999 he was Professor of Business informatics and Business Administration at the University of Essen. Since 2001 he is Professor of Information Management at the University of St. Gallen (School of Management), where from 2011 to 2013 he was Dean of the Economics faculty.

The research focus of Walter Brenner includes industrialization of information management, management of IT service providers, customer relationship management, use of new technologies and design thinking.

== Selected publications ==
Brenner has published several books and numerous articles. Books:

- Walter Brenner, Rupert Stadler, Andreas Herrmann. Erfolg im digitalen Zeitalter: Strategien von 17 Spitzenmanagern. FAZ, Frankfurt 2012.
- Walter Brenner, Christoph Witte. Business Innovation: CIOs im Wettbewerb der Ideen. FAZ, Frankfurt 2011.
- Walter Brenner, Andreas Resch, Veit Schulz. Die Zukunft der IT in Unternehmen: Managing IT as a Business. FAZ, Frankfurt 2010.
- Walter Brenner, Christoph Witte.'Erfolgsrezepte für CIOs: Was gute Informationsmanager ausmacht. Hanser, München 2006.
- Walter Brenner, Hubert Österle, Konrad Hilbers. Unternehmensführung und Informationssystem: Der Ansatz des St. Galler Informationssystem-Managements. Teubner, Stuttgart 1991. 2. Auflage 1992.
- Walter Brenner, Thomas Hess. Wirtschaftsinformatik in Wissenschaft und Praxis – Festschrift für Hubert Österle. Business Engineering. Springer, Berlin 2014.
