= Walter Brenner (chemical engineer) =

Austrian academic

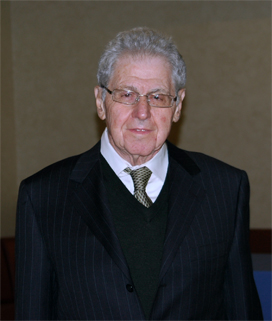
- Walter Brenner in 2012
- Born: July 21, 1923; Vienna, Austria
- Died: December 6, 2017 (aged 94); New Jersey, U.S.
- Education: Polytechnic Institute of Brooklyn
- Scientific career
- Fields: Chemical engineering
- Workplaces: Polytechnic Institute, New York University, Master Bond Inc.
- Doctoral advisor: Donald Othmer

Walter Brenner (July 21, 1923 – December 6, 2017) was an Austrian-American professor of chemical engineering and inventor. He also authored a number of patents, technical papers, magazine articles, and books. Brenner is recognized as having pioneered the development of high energy ionizing radiation for polymers to be used for industrial, aerospace, medical, and consumer applications. He died in December 2017 at the age of 94.

== Early life and education ==
Brenner was born in Vienna, Austria, in July 1923.

In 1938, the Brenner family was forced to leave Austria to escape the Nazi occupation. He attended James Madison High School in Brooklyn, NY, and in 1940 was admitted to the City College of New York where he graduated with a BA in Chemical Engineering.

In 1943, Brenner served in the U.S. military, achieving the rank of technical sergeant and remained in the service until 1945. When he completed his service in the military, Brenner attended the Polytechnic Institute of Brooklyn where he earned his Master's degree (1949) and later his doctorate (1954) in chemical engineering studying under the renowned Donald Othmer.

== Career ==
Brenner served as a full professor at New York University for over 25 years teaching chemical engineering. He taught in the uptown Bronx campus and later in the downtown Greenwich Village campus. Brenner's expertise led him to become a consultant working for many different companies, institutions, branches of the government and military over his professional career.

In 1976, Brenner and his son James co-founded a polymer formulation company called Master Bond Inc. Brenner developed specialty systems including adhesives, sealants, coatings, and encapsulants that are primarily epoxy-based. Additionally, Master Bond produces silicone, polysulfide, polyurethane, and UV light curing systems.

== Selected publications ==
=== Books ===
- Walter Brenner, Dorey Lum, Malcolm W. Riley. High Temperature Plastics. Reinhold, 1962.
- Yoshiyuki Okamoto, Walter Brenner. Organic Semiconductors. Reinhold, 1964.
- Rudolph Vermes, Walter Brenner. Radiation Crosslinking of some New Ethylene Copolymers. In: Irradiation of Polymers, edited by Robert F. Gould. Advances in Chemistry, Vol. 66. Chapter 11, pp 156–169. American Chemical Society, 1967.
- Walter Brenner, R. F. Shaffer, R. Vermes, Charles Marsel, William H. Kapfer. Nucleation Phenomena In Polymers. Defense Technical Information Center, 1968.
- Walter Brenner, Yoshiyuki Okamoto. Research on the Preparation of Pure Metals. Defense Technical Information Center, 1968.
- Walter Brenner, Barry Rugg. Investigation of Polymer Encapsulation of Cotton Fibers to Provide New and Useful Textile Products: Final Report, July 1966-July 1969. USDA Southern Utilization Research and Development Division, 1969.
- Walter Brenner, James J. Timlin. Powder Coating of M205 Non-Metallic Cartridge Cases. Defense Technical Information Center, 1974.
- Walter Brenner, Barry Rugg. Feasibility Studies Relative to Using New Polymers and Plastics as Inhibitors to Replace Compositions Presently Being Used with Rocket Propellant Grains of 155mm HE RAP (Rocket Assisted Projectile). Defense Technical Information Center, 1975.
- Walter Brenner, James J. Timlin. Environmental Protection of Pyrotechnic Products and Devices. Defense Technical Information Center, 1974.
- Business Communications Co, Walter Brenner. Future for High Performance Plastics. Business Communications Company, 1975.
- Walter Brenner. Exploratory Research on Novel Ambient Temperature Curing Techniques for Adhesives, Sealants and Laminates: Final Report. National Technical Information Service, 1979.
- Walter Brenner, Josef Arnon. Room Temperature Curing Epoxy Resin Compositions High Temperature Service Capability for Fiber Reinforced Structures, Adhesives and Sealants. Defense Technical Information Center, 1981.

=== Articles ===
- Walter Brenner, Zvi Blank, Y. Okamoto. Growth of Single Crystals of Lead Sulphide in Silica Gels near Ambient Temperatures. In: Nature, Volume 212, Issue 5060, pp. 392–393 (1966).
- Martin Prince, Bruce W. Bremer, Walter Brenner. Sodium Selenide Vicinal Dihalide Elimination In: The journal of organic chemistry. - [S.l.]: American Chemical Society, ISSN 1520-6904, Vol. 31, No. 12 (1966), p. 4292–4293.
- Zvi Blank, Walter Brenner, Yoshiyuki Okamoto. The growth of single crystals of lead sulphide in silica gels at ambient temperatures - preliminary characterization and effect of various organic compounds as sulphide ion donors. Research Division, School of Engineering and Science New York University, New York, N.Y.. Published by Elsevier Ltd., 1968.
- Walter Brenner. Recent Developments in Polymer Catalysis This paper was presented at a meeting of the Section of Catalysis on March 11, 1971. Published in: Transactions of the New York Academy of Sciences, Volume 33, Issue 7 Series II, pages 710–723, November 1971.
- Walter Brenner, Barry Rugg. High Temperature Dilute Acid Hydrolysis of Waste Cellulose: Batch and Continuous Processes. Hazardous Waste Engineering Research Laboratory, U.S. Environmental Protection Agency, 1986.
- Walter Brenner. Designers intro to advanced medical adhesives. Published in Medical Design, Penton Media Inc., November 1, 2008. Accessed October 26, 2012.
- Walter Brenner. Choosing the Right Epoxy for Optical Applications. Published in Photonics Spectra, Laurin Media, October 2012. Accessed October 26, 2012.

=== Patents ===
Patent Number	Date of Patent	Name of Patent	Inventors
3,137,995	June 23, 1964	Ablation Resistant Reaction Profulsion Nozzle	Donald F. Othmer & Walter Brenner
3,663,158	May 16, 1972	Method of Depositing an Oxymethylene Polymer from Formaldehyde in the Vapor Form on Cellulosic Textiles and the Resulting Product	Walter Brenner, Jagadish Chanda Goswami & Barry A. Rugg
3,852,412	December 3, 1974	Nitric Acid Recovery System	Walter Brenner
4,049,750	September 20, 1977	One Component Shelf Stable Low Shrinkage Structural Adhesive Systems	Walter Brenner
4,216,134	August 5, 1980	Triallylcyanurate or Triallylisocyanurate Based Adhesive Sealant Systems	Walter Brenner
4,316,747	February 23, 1982	Process for the Chemical Conversion of Cellulose Waste to Glucose	Barry A. Rugg & Walter Brenner
4,319,942	March 16, 1982	Radiation Curing of Flocked Composite Structures	Walter Brenner
4,334,477	June 15, 1982	Wear Reducer	Sydney Axelrod, Walter Brenner & Barry A. Rugg
4,368,079	January 11, 1983	Apparatus for Chemical Conversion of Materials and Particularly the Conversion of Cellulose Waste to Glucose	Barry A. Rugg & Walter Brenner
4,395,934	August 2, 1983	Wear Reducer	Sydney Axelrod, Walter Brenner & Barry A. Rugg
4,413,019	November 1, 1983	Radiation Curable Adhesive Compositions and Composite Structures	Walter Brenner
4,483,951	November 20, 1984	Radiation Curable Adhesive Compositions and Composite Structures	Walter Brenner
