= Electronic Markets (journal) =

- Discipline: Electronic commerce
- Language: English
- Edited by: Rainer Alt, Hans-Dieter Zimmermann

Publication details
- History: 1991-present
- Publisher: Springer Science+Business Media
- Frequency: Quarterly
- Open access: No
- Impact factor: 3.818 (2017)

Standard abbreviations
- ISO 4: Electron. Mark.

Indexing
- ISSN: 1019-6781 (print); 1422-8890 (web)
- OCLC no.: 47837080

Links
- Journal homepage; Journal page at publisher's website; Online archive

Electronic Markets - The International Journal on Networked Business is a quarterly double-blind peer-reviewed academic journal that covers research on the implications of information systems on e-commerce. It was established in 1991 and is published by Springer Science+Business Media. Since 2010, Electronic Markets is included in the Social Sciences Citation Index. The editors-in-chief are Rainer Alt (Leipzig University) and Hans-Dieter Zimmermann (FHS St. Gallen University of Applied Sciences).

== Abstracting and indexing ==
The journal is abstracted and indexed in Scopus, Inspec, ProQuest, Academic OneFile, Current Contents/Social & Behavioral Sciences, International Bibliography of the Social Sciences, and the Social Sciences Citation Index. According to the Journal Citation Reports, the journal has a 2017 impact factor of 3.818.
