= Hans Mulder (scientist) =

Dutch computer scientist (born 1969)

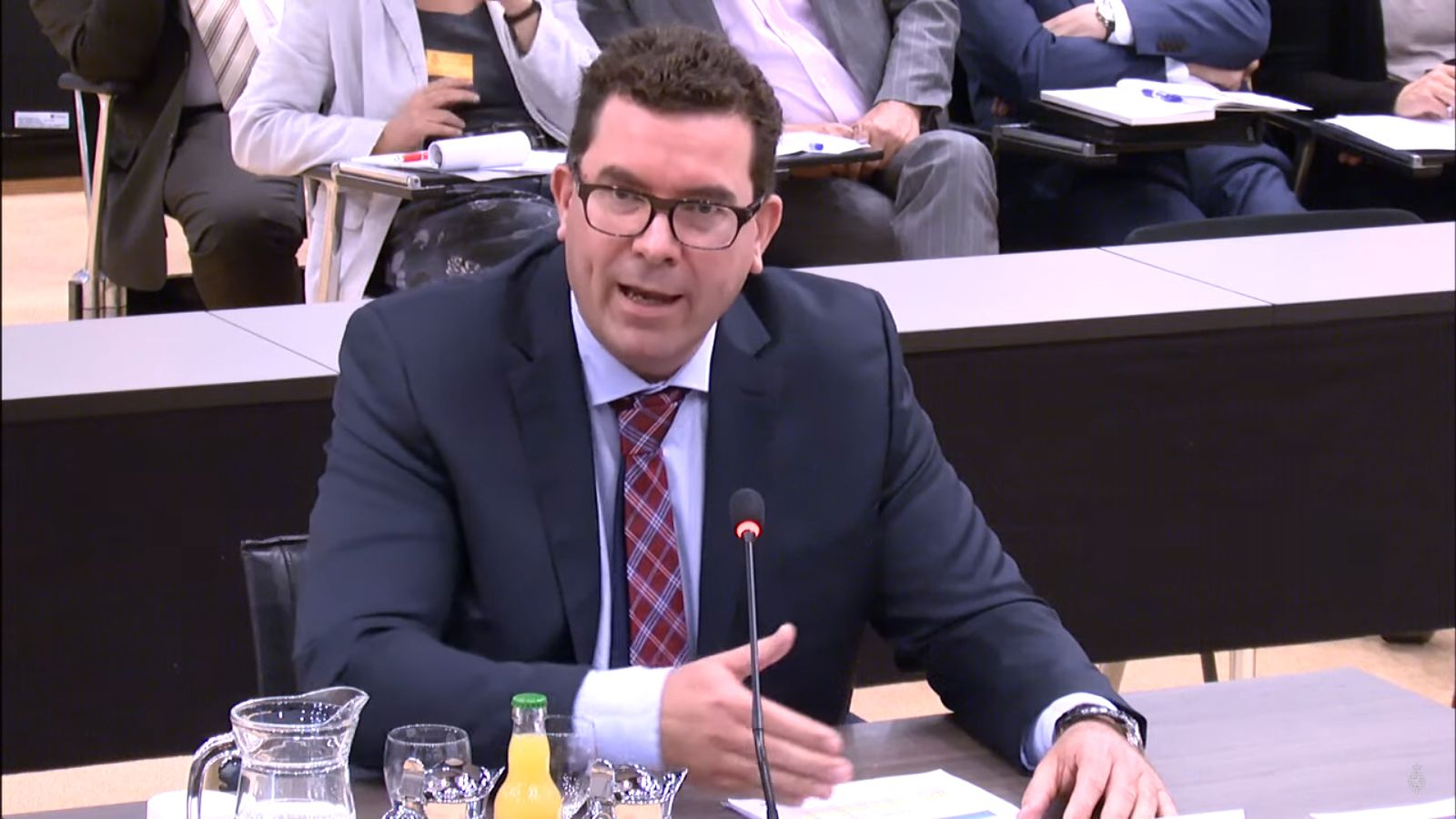
- Commission ICT - Hearing Day 1 - Hans Mulder, 2014
- Born: J.B.F. (Hans) Mulder; 1969 (age 56–57)
- Education: The Hague University of Applied Sciences, Nyenrode University, Delft University of Technology, Leiden University
- Known for: Rapid Enterprise Design
- Scientific career
- Fields: Enterprise engineering
- Workplaces: University of Antwerp
- Website: Hans Mulder

J.B.F. (Hans) Mulder (born 1969) is a Dutch computer scientist, Venture manager in the IT industry, and Professor at the University of Antwerp, known for his work on enterprise engineering.

== Biography ==
Mulder is the son of Theo Mulder (1942–2021), former professor at the Maastricht University and Venture capitalist. He received his BA in informatics in 1993 from The Hague University of Applied Sciences, and his MA in Business Administration in 1994 from Nyenrode University.

Beside his work he continued his studies. In 1996 obtained a post academic degree in business systems engineering at the Delft University of Technology, and a Post Academic degree from Leiden University in 2006. In the year 2006 he also received his PhD in Enterprise Design at the Delft University of Technology with the thesis, entitled "Rapid Enterprise Design" under supervision of Jan Dietz.

From 1984 to 1988 Mulder had started his career as assistant at Multihouse Automatisering. After his studies at The Hague University and the Nyenrode University he was management trainee at Van Leeuwen Pipe and Tube Group in 1994-95. In 1995 he started as Affiliated researcher at the Delft University of Technology, and started his own company VIAgroep for ventures in the IT-industry. In 2005 he started to lecture at the Police academy in Apeldoorn. In 2007 he was appointed Professor at the University of Antwerp, and in 2008 Executive Professor at Antwerp Management School. Since 2011 he is also European research Director at the Standish Group.

Mulder participates in numerous other organizations, is Licensed Mediator and Expert in multiple Courts.

== Publications ==
Mulder has authored and co-authored over 100 articles and several books in his fields of expertise. Books, a selection:

- 2006. Rapid Enterprise Design . Thesis Delft University of Technology.
- 2009. Eenvoud in complexiteit : de passie van een ondernemersfamilie

Articles, a selection:

- Dietz, J. L. G., and J. B. F. Mulder. "Transformation of organisations requires constructional knowledge of business systems." Hawaii International Conference in Systems Sciences1998. 1998.
- Van Reijswoud, Victor E., Hans BF Mulder, and Jan LG Dietz. "Communicative action‐based business process and information systems modelling with DEMO." Information Systems Journal 9.2 (1999): 117-138.
- Van Nuffel, Dieter, Hans Mulder, and Steven Van Kervel. "Enhancing the formal Foundations of BPMN by Enterprise Ontology." Advances in Enterprise Engineering III. Springer Berlin Heidelberg, 2009. 115-129.
- Bobbert, Yuri, and Hans Mulder. "Group Support Systems Research in the Field of Business Information Security: A Practitioner's View." System Sciences (HICSS), 2013 46th Hawaii International Conference on. IEEE, 2013.
- Jan Dietz, Jan Hoogervorst, Junichi Iijima, Hans Mulder, Martin Op ’t Land, Erik Proper, José Tribolet, Jan Verelst, Robert Winter et al. (2013). "The discipline of enterprise engineering". International Journal of Organisational Design and Engineering, 3(1), 86-114.
