= Martin Op 't Land =

Dutch organizational theorist (born 1959)

Martinus (Martin) Op 't Land (born 1959) is a Dutch organizational theorist, consultant and Professor of Enterprise Engineering at the University of Antwerp and at Antwerp Management School, known for his contributions in the field of Enterprise Architecture.

== Education ==
Op 't Land received his Propedeuse in Chemistry in 1979 at the Leiden University, and also his MSc in Mathematics in 1984. Later in 2008 he received his PhD from the Delft University of Technology with a thesis titled "Applying architecture and ontology to the splitting and allying of enterprises" under supervision of Jan Dietz.

== Career ==
Op 't Land started his career as consultant in 1985 at Volmac (acquired by Capgemini in 1992), where he became Principal Consultant and Certified Global Architect.

In 2011 he was appointed as Professor of Enterprise Engineering at the Antwerp Management School.

His research interest is in the field of "coherently (re)shaping organisation and information of extended enterprises in splits, mergers and alliances".

== Publications ==
Op 't Land has authored and co-authored numerous publications in his field of expertise. Books:

- Op 't Land, Martin. Applying Architecture and Ontology to the Splitting and Allying of Enterprises. (2008).
- Op 't Land, Martin, ed. Enterprise Architecture - Creating Value by Informed Governance. (Springer, 2009).

=== Articles ===
- Op 't Land, Martin, and Erik Proper. "Impact of Principles on Enterprise Engineering." ECIS. 2007.
- Jan Dietz, Jan Hoogervorst, Junichi Iijima, Hans Mulder, Martin Op ’t Land, Erik Proper, José Tribolet, Jan Verelst, Robert Winter et al. (2013). "The discipline of enterprise engineering". International Journal of Organisational Design and Engineering, 3(1), 86-114.
