= Erik Proper =

Dutch computer scientist (born 1967)

Henderik Alex (Erik) Proper (born 22 May 1967) is a Dutch computer scientist, an FNR PEARL Laureate, and a full professor for Enterprise and Process Engineering at TU Wien, Austria. He is known for work on conceptual modeling, enterprise architecture and enterprise engineering.

== Biography ==
Born in Rheden, Proper studied computer science at the Radboud University Nijmegen. In 1990 he received his MSc, and in 1994 his PhD with distinction with a thesis entitled "A Theory for Conceptual Modelling of Evolving Application Domains" under supervision of Eckhard D. Falkenberg.

After graduation, Proper started his academic as computer science researcher at the University of Queensland in Australia, and lecturer at the Queensland University of Technology. Back in The Netherlands in 1997 Proper started working in the software industry as consultant at Atos Origin in Amsterdam, and later for Ordina in Gouda. He was appointed as an adjunct professor at the Radboud University in Nijmegen, where he became full professor of evolving information systems in 2002. From 2008 to 2010 he worked as a consultant for Capgemini. In 2010 he became a senior researcher at the Public Research Centre Henri Tudor, which was later merged with Public Research Centre Gabriel Lippmann to become the Luxembourg Institute of Science and Technology. Between 2008 and 2018, he also continued his affiliation with Radboud University as an adjunct professor. From June 2017 to the end of 2022, he also hold an adjunct professorship in data and knowledge engineering at the University of Luxembourg.

In 2012 Proper was awarded the IFIP Outstanding Service Award from the International Federation for Information Processing (IFIP).

As of January 2022, Erik is vice-chair of the IFIP 8.1 working group, while also being the representative for the Netherlands in IFIP's TC8 technical committee. He is also the Stellvertretender Sprecher (vice chair) of the EMISA working group of the German Computer Science Society (Gesellschaft für Informatik).

In January 2023, he joined TU Wien and became full professor for Enterprise and Process Engineering at the Business Informatics Group.

== Work ==
=== A Theory for Conceptual Modelling of Evolving Application Domains, 1994 ===
In his 1994 PhD thesis "A Theory for Conceptual Modelling of Evolving Application Domains," Proper developed a formal specification of information system development. This specification was based Object-role modeling, and was one of the many extensions to its basic framework. These extensions are basically abstract mechanisms, that "allow users to control the amount of detail seen at any given time."

While Proper focussed on schema evolution with Object-role modeling, other researchers in the 1990s had focussed on a range of related topics. Halpin (2006) summarized that that research ranged from "reverse engineering, support for complex objects, process-event modeling, external schema generation... schema optimization, meta-modeling, subtype extensions, null handling, object-oriented mapping, unary nesting, [to] empirical research."

=== Enterprise Architecture, 2009 ===
In the 2009 "Enterprise Architecture: Creating Value by Informed Governance," Op 't Land and Proper traced the notion of architecture in the field of information systems development. They summarized:

When software applications became larger and larger, people such as Shaw and Garlan coined the term software architecture. This notion of architecture deals with the key design principles underlying software artefacts. In the 1980s and 1990s, people became aware that the development of information technology (IT) should be done in conjunction with the development of the context in which it was used. This led to the identification of the so-called business/IT alignment problem. Solving the business/IT alignment problem requires enterprises to align human, organizational, informational, and technological aspects of systems..."

And furthermore:

Quite early on, the term architecture was also introduced as a means to further alignment, and thus analyzes and solves business?IT alignment problems, Recently, the awareness emerged that alignment between business and IT is not enough, there are many more aspects in the enterprise in need of alignment. This has led to the use of the term architecture at the enterprise level: enterprise architecture.

=== Architecture Principles, 2011 ===
In "Architecture Principles – The Cornerstones of Enterprise Architecture," (2011) Greefhorst and Proper present an extensive study of architecture principles. They presume that "enterprises, from small to large, evolve continuously. As a result, their structures are transformed and extended continuously. Without some means of control, such changes are bound to lead to an overly complex, uncoordinated and heterogeneous environment that is hard to manage and hard to adapt to future changes. Enterprise architecture principles provide a means to direct transformations of enterprises. As a consequence, architecture principles should be seen as the cornerstones of any architecture."

Furthermore they argue, that this work "provide[s] both a theoretical and a practical perspective on architecture principles. The theoretical perspective involves a brief survey of the general concept of principle as well as an analysis of different flavors of principles. Architecture principles are regarded as a specific class of normative principles that direct the design of an enterprise, from the definition of its business to its supporting IT. The practical perspective on architecture principles is concerned with an approach to the formulation of architecture principles, as well as their actual use in organizations."

== Publications ==
Proper has authored and co-authored numerous publications in the fields of enterprise engineering, enterprise architecture and enterprise modelling. Books, a selection:

- Proper, H. A., A Theory for Conceptual Modelling of Evolving Application Domains. Doctoral thesis Radboud University Nijmegen, 1994.
- Proper, H. A., Martin Op 't Land, Maarten Waage, Jeroen Cloo, and Claudia Steghuis. Enterprise Architecture – Creating Value by Informed Governance. With Berlin : Springer, 2008.
- Proper, H. A., Roel Wieringa, Pascal van Eck and Claudia Steghuis. Competences of IT Architects. With The Hague : Academic Service, 2008.
- Proper, H. A. and Danny Greefhorst, Architecture Principles – The Cornerstones of Enterprise Architecture. With Berlin : Springer, 2011.

Articles, a selection:

- Ter Hofstede, A. H., Proper, H. A., & Van Der Weide, T. P. (1993). Formal definition of a conceptual language for the description and manipulation of information models. Information Systems, 18(7), 489–523.
- Halpin, Terry A., and Henderik Alex Proper. "Subtyping and polymorphism in object-role modelling." Data & Knowledge Engineering 15.3 (1995): 251–281.
- Jonkers, H., van Buuren, R., Arbab, F., De Boer, F., Bonsangue, M., Bosma, H., Ter Doest, H., Groenewegen, L., Scholten, J.G., Hoppenbrouwers, S., Iacob, M-A., Janssen, W., Lankhorst, M., Van Leeuwen, D., Proper, E., Stam, A., Van der Torre, L. & van Zanten, G. V. (September 2003). Towards a language for coherent enterprise architecture descriptions. In Enterprise Distributed Object Computing Conference, 2003. Proceedings. Seventh IEEE International (pp. 28–37). IEEE.
- Jan Dietz, Jan Hoogervorst, Junichi Iijima, Hans Mulder, Martin Op ’t Land, Erik Proper, José Tribolet, Jan Verelst, Robert Winter et al. (2013). "The discipline of enterprise engineering". International Journal of Organisational Design and Engineering, 3(1), 86-114.
