= Jan Verelst (computer scientist) =

Belgian computer scientist (born c.1960)

Jan Verelst (born ca 1960) is a Belgian computer scientist, Professor and Dean of the Department of Management Information Systems at the University of Antwerp, and Professor at the Antwerp Management School, known for his work on Normalized Systems.

== Biography ==
Verelst obtained his Ph.D. in Management Information Systems in 1999 from the University of Antwerp with a thesis entitled "De invloed van variabiliteit op de evolueerbaarheid van conceptuele modellen van informatiesystemen" (The impact of variability on the evolvability of conceptual models of information systems).

After his graduation he was appointed Professor of Systems Development Methodology at the Faculty of Applied Economics of the University of Antwerp, and Dean of the Department of Management Information Systems. He is also appointed as Professor at Antwerp Management School.

His research interests are in the field of "conceptual modeling of information systems, evolvability, and maintainability of information systems, empirical software engineering, and open source software", specifically the development of Normalized Systems, and its development methodology.

== Publications ==
Verelst authored and co-authored many publications in his field of expertise. Books:

- Mannaert, Herwig; Verelst, Jan (2009). Normalized Systems: Re-creating Information Technology Based on Laws for Software Evolvability. Koppa. ISBN 978-90-77160-00-8. Archived from the original on October 28, 2017.
- Mannaert, Herwig; Verelst, Jan; De Bruyn, Peter (2016). Normalized Systems Theory From Foundations for Evolvable Software Toward a General Theory for Evolvable Design. Koppa. ISBN 978-90-77160-091.

Articles, a selection:

- Du Bois, Bart, Serge Demeyer, and Jan Verelst. "Refactoring-improving coupling and cohesion of existing code." Reverse Engineering, 2004. Proceedings. 11th Working Conference on. IEEE, 2004.
- Hidders, J., Dumas, M., van der Aalst, W. M., ter Hofstede, A. H., & Verelst, J. (2005, January). "When are two workflows the same?." In Proceedings of the 2005 Australasian symposium on Theory of computing-Volume 41 (pp. 3–11). Australian Computer Society, Inc..
- Ven, Kris, Jan Verelst, and Herwig Mannaert. "Should you adopt open source software?." IEEE Software 25.3 (2008): 54-59.
- Huysmans, Philip, Kris Ven, and Jan Verelst. "Using the DEMO methodology for modeling open source software development processes." Information and Software Technology 52.6 (2010): 656-671.
- Jan Dietz, Jan Hoogervorst, Junichi Iijima, Hans Mulder, Martin Op ’t Land, Erik Proper, José Tribolet, Jan Verelst, Robert Winter et al. (2013). "The discipline of enterprise engineering". International Journal of Organisational Design and Engineering, 3(1), 86-114.
