= José Tribolet =

Portuguese engineer and academic (born 1949)

José Manuel Nunes Salvador Tribolet (born 20 December 1949) is a Portuguese engineer, and Professor of Information Systems at the Instituto Superior Técnico - University of Lisbon, Portugal, who became known for his work on speech coding in the late 1970s.

== Biography ==
Tribolet received his 5-Year "Engenheiro" Degree in Electrical Engineering in 1971 at the Instituto Superior Tecnico - University of Lisbon, Lisbon, Portugal, and in the United States at the Massachusetts Institute of Technology his MA in electrical engineering in 1974, and his Ph.D. in computer science in 1977. In 1998 he spent a sabbatical year as a Visiting Sloan Fellow at the MIT Sloan School of Management.

After graduation in 1977 Tribolet started working as researcher at AT&T Bell Laboratories in Murray Hill, NJ. In 1979 back in Portugal he was appointed Full Professor of the Electrical Engineering Department at the Instituto Superior Técnico (Technical University of Lisbon). In 1998 he became Full Professor of Information Systems at the Department of Computer Science and Engineering.

In Lisbon he co-founded in 1980 INESC - Institute for Systems and Computer Engineering, the first not-for-profit, non-state-owned contract based research organization of Portugal, which he presides ever since. In 2012 he was Visiting Professor at the University of St. Gallen.

Tribolet was awarded the IEEE ASSP 1979 Best Paper Award, and the IEEE ASSP 1984 Best Paper Award.

== Work ==
Tribolet's research interests are in the fields of "organizational modeling, business process engineering and information systems architecture." According to Tribolet (2007):

"Organizations are complex, dynamic systems. At any given moment, an organization is the result of the many interactions among its active components, which in turn affect the internal states of all and every such organizational components. The static and the dynamic behavior of an organization is thus the resultant of these interactions along time.
None of this is news to the engineering world. Through modern science, mankind has learned to conceive, design, develop, build, operate and maintain very complex systems indeed, from spacecraft to deep sea ships, from nuclear power stations to nano-robots for human surgery, from bio-devices to intelligent toys. It is time to pull together the vast amounts of know-how accumulated by mankind, in the social sciences and in the real-world of managerial experience, with the intellectual capital accumulated in the hard sciences and the real-world transformations induced by the ICT instrumentations of modern human environment.
Dealing with Complex Dynamic Systems through “old-time common good sense” is simply “non-sense”, in today´s chaotic world. Enabling real-time “dynamic flight control” of a complex organization requires sound organizational engineering and real time monitoring and control of all the human and machine active elements that “are” the organization."

== Publications ==
Tribolet has published numerous articles. A selection:

- Tribolet, José. "A new phase unwrapping algorithm." Acoustics, Speech and Signal Processing, IEEE Transactions on 25.2 (1977): 170-177.
- Flanagan, James Loton, et al. "Speech coding." IEEE Transactions on Communications 27 (1979): 710-737.
- Vasconcelos, André, et al. "A framework for modeling strategy, business processes and information systems." Enterprise Distributed Object Computing Conference, 2001. EDOC'01. Proceedings. Fifth IEEE International. IEEE, 2001.
- Caetano, Artur, Antonio Ritó Silva, and José Tribolet. "Using roles and business objects to model and understand business processes." Proceedings of the 2005 ACM symposium on Applied computing. ACM, 2005.
- Jan Dietz, Jan Hoogervorst, Junichi Iijima, Hans Mulder, Martin Op ’t Land, Erik Proper, José Tribolet, Jan Verelst, Robert Winter et al. (2013). "The discipline of enterprise engineering". International Journal of Organisational Design and Engineering, 3(1), 86-114.
