= Junichi Iijima =

Junichi Iijima (born August 28, 1954), Japanese, Enterprise Engineer and Professor of the Department of Industrial Management and Engineering at the Tokyo Institute of Technology in Japan.

== Biography ==
Born in Hokkaido, Junichi Iijima in 1983 received his PhD in systems theory at the Tokyo Institute of Technology.

In 1981 Junichi Iijima had started his academic career as assistant professor of the Department of Systems Science of the Tokyo Institute of Technology. He moved to the Tokyo Institute of Technology Department of Industrial Engineering and Management to become associate professor in 1991, and Full Professor of that department in 1996. He was also Dean of the Graduate School of Decision Science and Technology.

Currently, he is the director of the Career Advancement Professional School and the director of CBEC (Cross-Boader Entrepreneur Cultivating) program. He is also in charge of Egypt E-JUST (Egypt-Japan University of Science and Technology) in Tokyo Institute of Technology. Junichi Iijima's research interests are in the field of mathematical systems theory and information systems, more specific "decision support, group support, and organization-ware." In his own words: "I especially have a great interest on Information Systems Development Methodology aligned with Business Architecture, as well as mobile commerce and IT Investments. My philosophy is 'a rolling stone gathers no moss'..."

His current interest is on DEMO (Design & Engineering Methodology for Organizations) and IT-CMF (IT Capability Maturity Framework).

== Publications ==
Junichi Iijima has published numerous articles in the field. A selection:

- Yasuda, Hiroshi, and Junichi Iijima. "Linkage between strategic alliances and firm’s business strategy: the case of semiconductor industry." Technovation 25.5 (2005): 513–521.
- Enjo, Hidekazu, Motonari Tanabu, and Junichi Iijima. "A step toward foundation of class diagram algebra for enterprise service systems." Service Systems and Service Management, 2009. ICSSSM'09. 6th International Conference on. IEEE, 2009.
- Riera, Christian G., Dai Senoo, and Junichi IIjima. "A study of the effect of knowledge creating capabilities on corporate performance." International Journal of Knowledge Management Studies 3.1 (2009): 116–133.
- Jing Tang, LG Pee, Junichi Iijima: Business Process Orientation: An Empirical Study of Its Impact on Employees' Innovativeness. Business Process Management Workshops 2012: 451–464
- Jan Dietz, Jan Hoogervorst, Junichi Iijima, Hans Mulder, Martin Op ’t Land, Erik Proper, José Tribolet, Jan Verelst, Robert Winter et al. (2013). "The discipline of enterprise engineering". International Journal of Organisational Design and Engineering, 3(1), 86–114.
