= Van Thienen =

van Thienen or Vanthienen is a surname. Notable people with the surname include:

- Jacob van Thienen (died 1410), Flemish architect
- Jan Vanthienen (born 1956), Belgian business theorist and computer scientist

== See also ==
- Van Thielen
