= Robert Winter (business theorist) =

Robert Winter (born c. 1960) is a German business theorist, Professor of business & information systems engineering at the University of St. Gallen, and director of its Institute of Information Management. He is known for his contributions in the field of Enterprise Architecture and Business Engineering.

== Biography ==
Winter studied economics, business administration and business education at the Goethe University Frankfurt, where he received his PhD in 1989 and his Habilitation in 1995.

Winter started his academic career in 1984 as Associate Professor at Goethe University Frankfurt. In 1996 he moved to the University of St. Gallen, where he is appointed Professor at the School of Management (SoM), and director of its Institute of Information Management (Instituts für Wirtschaftsinformatik). Winter is Vice Editor-in-Chief of the Business & Information Systems Engineering Journal and associate editor of the European Journal of Information Systems, International Journal of Organizational Design and Engineering and MISQ Executive Journal.

His research interests are in the field of "Situational Method Engineering for Information Management, Enterprise Architecture Management, Enterprise Transformation Management, Health Network Engineering, Corporate Management Systems and Service Innovation & Engineering."

== Publications ==
Winter authored and coauthored numerous publications. Books, a selection:

- Österle, Hubert, and Robert Winter. Business engineering. Springer Berlin Heidelberg, 2003.
- Robert Winter, J. Leon Zhao & Stephan Aier (eds.) Global perspectives on design science research : 5th international conference, DESRIST 2010, St. Gallen, Switzerland, June 4–5, 2010 : proceedings. Berlin : Springer, 2010.

Articles, a selection:

- Winter, Robert. "Modelle, techniken und werkzeuge im business engineering." Business Engineering. Springer Berlin Heidelberg, 2003. 87-118.
- Braun, Christian, and Robert Winter. "A comprehensive enterprise architecture metamodel and its implementation using a metamodeling platform." Desel, Jörg; Frank, Ulrich (2005): 24-25.
- Winter, Robert, and Ronny Fischer. "Essential layers, artifacts, and dependencies of enterprise architecture." Enterprise Distributed Object Computing Conference Workshops, 2006. EDOCW'06. 10th IEEE International. IEEE, 2006.
- Winter, Robert. "Organisational design and engineering: proposal of a conceptual framework and comparison of business engineering with other approaches." International Journal of Organisational Design and Engineering 1.1 (2010): 126-147.
- Loos, P., Lechtenbörger, J., Vossen, G., Zeier, A., Krüger, J., Müller, J., ... & Winter, R. (2011). "In-memory databases in business information systems." Business & Information Systems Engineering, 3(6), 389-395.
- Jan Dietz, Jan Hoogervorst, Junichi Iijima, Hans Mulder, Martin Op ’t Land, Erik Proper, José Tribolet, Jan Verelst, Robert Winter et al. (2013). "The discipline of enterprise engineering". International Journal of Organisational Design and Engineering, 3(1), 86-114.
