= Talent manager =

Person or company that guides the career of an artist

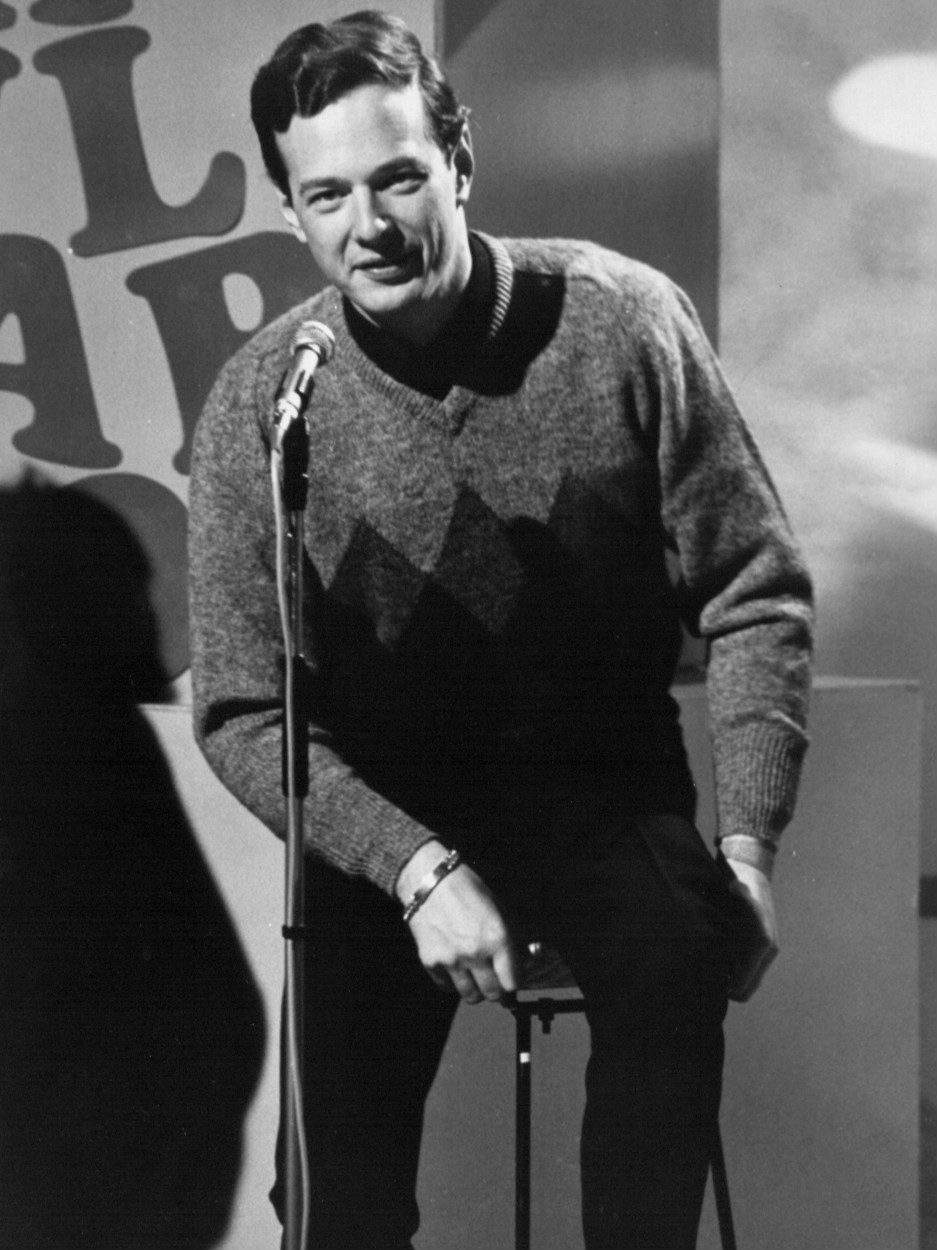
Talent manager Brian Epstein possessed his own celebrity status alongside his role serving the Beatles and other artists, such as by hosting this NBC broadcast in January 1965.

A talent manager (also known as an artist manager, band manager, or music manager) is an individual who guides the professional career of artists within the entertainment industry. The responsibility of a talent manager is to oversee the day-to-day business affairs of an artist. This frequently involves how they advise and counsel talent concerning professional matters alongside the making of long-term plans and other personal decisions that may affect the entertainer's career. Finding success as an artist can be challenging, and managers play a key role in guiding career development, managing business affairs, and connecting artists with industry opportunities.

An artist manager is also a person responsible for hiring and managing the employees in a company. Depending on the nature of the organization that the individual administers, they may play a comparatively active role in both the day-to-day lives of musicians as well as contribute in some fashion to recording related choices. For example, the British talent manager Brian Epstein received popular attention as a celebrity alongside his artists, which included the Beatles, and has been referred to as the "Fifth Beatle".

The roles and responsibilities of a talent manager vary slightly from industry to industry, as do the commissions to which the manager is entitled. For example, a music manager's duties differ from those managers who advise actors, writers, or directors. Recent research indicates that the role of music managers has expanded significantly in the digital era, with managers increasingly taking on responsibilities such as social media management and content creation. A manager can also help artists find an agent or help them decide when to leave their current agent and identify whom to select as a new agent. Talent agents have the authority to make deals for their clients while managers usually can only informally establish connections with producers and studios but do not have the ability to negotiate contracts.

== History ==
Modern talents managers are associated with all artistic fields, sports, as well as various fields in business. Talent agents have at times been covered in the music or art press almost as intently as artists themselves, for example the various talent agents who spearheaded the British Invasion of The Beatles and Herman's Hermits in the 1960s such as Brian Epstein, Allan Williams, Harvey Lisberg. Infamous examples in the music press include Allen Klein, manager of both The Beatles and The Rolling Stones.

The industry of talent management has been unionized or organized in several forms throughout history. In the United States, a notable early example was the Association of Talent Agents, which was formed in Los Angeles, California in 1937. The ATA comes out of the Wagner Act upheld by the Supreme Court which established many of the unions and guilds that regulate people who work in the entertainment industry such as the Screen Actors Guild, Directors Guild of America, and Writers Guild of America.

== Music managers ==
A music manager (or band manager) may handle career areas for bands, singers, and DJs. A music manager may be hired by a musician or band, or the manager may discover the band, and the relationship is usually contractually bound with mutual assurances, warranties, performances guarantees, and so forth. The manager's main job is to help with determining decisions related to career moves, bookings, promotion, business deals, recording contracts, etc. The role of music managers can be extensive and may include similar duties to that of a press agent, promoter, booking agent, business manager (who are usually certified public accountants), tour managers, and sometimes even a personal assistant.

Manager's contracts, however, cannot license those responsibilities unto the manager in the same way a state license would empower the agent to do so. Therefore, conflicting areas of interest may arise unless those are clarified in the contract. That said, a manager should be able to read and understand and explain a contract and study up on the long-term implications of contractual agreements that they, the bands, and the people they do business with, enter into. Before the manager enters into an agreement with the band, their relationship may be regarded as competing for interest; after a good contract is signed, their interests, obligations and incentives are aligned, and the interest in success is shared.

Responsibilities of a music manager are often divided among many who manage various aspects of a musical career. With an unsigned act, music managers may assume multiple roles: graphic designer, publicist, promoter, and handling money and finances. As an artist's career develops, responsibilities may grow, and because of their percentage agreement with the band, the manager's income may grow as well.

A music manager becomes important to managing the many different pieces that make up a career in music. The manager can assist singers, songwriters, and instrumentalists in molding a career, finding music producers, and developing relationships with record companies, publishers, agents, and the music-loving public. They should carefully consider when certain contributions have been made which would also entitle them to cowriting credits, Executive Producer credit, or Producer credit should they become involved in songwriting, financing works, or actually producing demos and recordings, and should carefully know these jobs and these fees should be considered either as separate from the contract, in addition to the contract, or as free to the musician as clarified in emails and the contract.

The duties of an active music manager may include supporting the band's development of a reputation for the musician(s) and building a fan base, which may include mastering and launching a demo CD, developing and releasing press kits, planning promotional activities, creating social network identities for bands, and booking shows. A music manager may be present during recording sessions and should support the artist during the creative process while not interfering between the artist and the producer, but musicians may also find valuable feedback in the extra pair of ears, and this should be carefully considered as well. The manager may gain access to a recording studio, photographers, and promotions. The manager will see that CD labels, posters, and promotional materials appropriately represent the band or artist, and that press kits are released in a timely manner to appropriate media. Launching a CD with complementary venues and dates is also a music manager's responsibility.

Among all the business and professional responsibilities that music managers assume; they also become a pseudo parent for the group and help with personal matters usually. This is both for the psyche of the group and to ensure that things are running smoothly.

Early on in an artist's career, the different facets of management and marketing fall upon either the band itself or, if they have one, their manager. Because the band or artist is relatively unknown initially, promotion, booking, and touring are minimal. A new music manager begins by establishing a clear understanding of what the artist(s) want. This can be accomplished through either a written or verbal contract. A music manager's first task is to solidify all artist development aspects and then concentrate on product development.

== Management strategies ==
Despite the dominant presence of digital media in the music industry, there are many typical strategies that even the most modernized managers must adhere to in order to reach the managerial goals effectively. Most of these trick-of-the-trade strategies are employed to establish and maintain connections with booking agents, promote the activities of the artist, and manage finances in order to optimize the artist's ability to book gigs, establish a fan base, and ultimately bring in revenue from their work, respectively. Music managers often navigate tensions between artistic creativity and commercial objectives when making career decisions.

=== Booking gigs ===
Among the more traditional responsibilities of music managers are booking and promoting gigs for their artist(s). Managers often become known for establishing ongoing relationships with specific venues, booking one artist at the venue regularly, or several artists on their roster. A large number of 'how-to' books have been published on the topic.

=== Internet strategies ===
As technology has advanced, the music industry has consequently undergone a drastic change in the way it operates. The internet has made it both easier and harder to attract the attention of fans and the press, as both outreach and industry saturation increase. "The sale of prerecorded music has diminished, but there's so much more that's going on. You can't focus on what's not working when there are so many other opportunities.". Social media is a common form of online networking for managers, and platforms such as MySpace, Facebook, Beatport, Bandcamp, SoundCloud, DistroKid and YouTube have been noted in the press for their use in networking in the music industry. Other fields such as business may use more common websites such as LinkedIn or Google+, while networking on behalf of a client.

Not everyone is so optimistic about the role of social media in the music industry. In his article, "Why Music Won't Be Saved By Social Media", Wes Davenport suggests that the role of social media in the industry "has been grossly inflated". In the article, Davenport quotes Jon Ostrow saying, "Social media is a conversation tool – that's it", acknowledging that there is potential for sparking conversation and building a fan base, but suggesting that social media does not necessarily live up to the potential for success that people in our modern culture seem to give credit. This is further supported by research indicating that creative production using modern digital tools often requires extensive human input and iteration to achieve high-quality results.

=== Digital case Study: Lady Gaga ===
In an article titled, "Case study: Making money from music" by Martin Kupp, Jamie Anderson and Joerg Reckhenrich, the effects of technological advances on the music industry are analyzed through an online marketing strategy that led to the incredible success of Lady Gaga. Troy Carter of Coalition Media signed Gaga with the intention of making her into a star with the help of some clever marketing. Recognizing that digitalization was the cause of the almost 33% decrease in the music industry's total revenue between the years 2000 and 2007, Carter decided to find a way to use digitalization to his advantage with his newly signed artist. Coalition Media, with the help of marketing company ThinkTank Digital, invested large amounts of time and money into developing Lady Gaga's global presence through social media.

They set up interviews with online bloggers, and established a following on Myspace through "constant news updates, exclusives, interviews, and special features". Gaga also personally ran her X account, building a connection with many of her fans. The article focuses on Coalition Media and Lady Gaga's utilization of the "Four E's": Emotions, Experiences, Engaging, and Exclusive. By following these "Four E's", Lady Gaga was able to achieve success within her music career.

== Compensation ==
Striking a tentative compensation agreement that can be renegotiated after three or four months is recommended, and the rate of pay is generally based on commissions of 20-80%, or more, of performance and commercial incomes. This amount depends on the level of development the band or artist is at and the experience, networks and resources of the manager. (The less developed the artist and more experienced the manager, the higher the commission.) The artist or band should never agree to circumstances that cannot be terminated or negotiated within a short period of time.

== Photography ==
Managers usually secure the services of a professional photographer while the artist is recording. Different 8x10 pictures of the artist can be used for websites, CD labels/jackets, posters, and the press kit. Cost for high quality shoots vary from $500 for a basic shoot to thousands for several looks. Photographers are not expected to cover material cost. It is important that the manager obtains an agreement upfront confirming license to use the images which will cover the uses necessary, in addition to high resolution digital images on CD. Managers are also advised to have photographs taken before CD designs or artwork goes into production. Managers are also responsible for hiring additional staff when necessary.

== See also ==
- Talent agent
