= UAMS =

UAMS may refer to:

- University of Arkansas for Medical Sciences in Little Rock, Arkansas, United States
- Universiteit Antwerpen Management School in Antwerp, Belgium
