= Bart Cambré =

Bart Cambré (born 1970) is a Belgian organizational theorist, Associate Professor of Business Research Methods and Research director at the Antwerp Management School, and consultant, known for his work on voluntary and temporary organizations.

== Biography ==
Cambré received an undergraduate degree in Sociology and Research methodology in 1992 at the Katholieke Universiteit Leuven, his MA in Development Studies in 1994 at the Université catholique de Louvain, and his PhD in the Social Sciences in 2002 back at the Katholieke Universiteit Leuven.

Cambré started his academic career as assistant professor at the Katholieke Universiteit Leuven in 1992. From 2006 to 2010 he was assistant professor at the Tilburg University, and in 2010 also associate professor at the TIAS School for Business and Society. In 2011 at the Antwerp Management School he was appointed associate professor of business research methods, and director of research.

Cambré research interests are in the fields of "business research methods with a focus on the configurational approach, temporary organizations, quality of work, and organizational renewal."

== Publications ==
Cambré authored and co-authored many publications in his field of expertise. Books, a selection:

- Billiet, Jacques, and Bart Cambré. Social capital, active membership in voluntary associations and some aspects of political participation: an empirical case study. (1999).
- Welkenhuysen-Gybels, Jerry, Fons van de Vijver, and Bart Cambré. A comparison of methods for the evaluation of construct equivalence in a multigroup setting. (2007).
- Kenis, Patrick, Martyna Janowicz, and Bart Cambré, eds. Temporary organizations: prevalence, logic and effectiveness. Edward Elgar Publishing, 2009.

Articles, a selection:

- Cambré, Bart, Jerry Welkenhuysen-Gybels, and Jaak Billiet. "Is it content or style? An evaluation of two competitive measurement models applied to a balanced set of ethnocentrism items." International Journal of Comparative Sociology 43.1 (2002): 1-20.
- Welkenhuysen-Gybels, Jerry, Jaak Billiet, and Bart Cambré. "Adjustment for acquiescence in the assessment of the construct equivalence of Likert-type score items." Journal of Cross-Cultural Psychology 34.6 (2003): 702-722.
