= Van Beirendonck =

Van Beirendonck is a Belgian surname. Notable people with the surname include:

- Lou Van Beirendonck (born 1960), Belgium Professor HRM at Antwerp Management School
- Walter Van Beirendonck (born 1957), Belgian fashion designer
