= Jan Verelst =

Jan Verelst may refer to:

- John Verelst (1648–1734), also Jan, Dutch Golden Age painter
- Jan Verelst (computer scientist) (born c. 1960), Belgian computer scientist
