= Koen Vandenbempt =

Koen Vandenbempt (born c. 1970) is a Belgian organizational theorist, business executive, and Professor of Strategy at the University of Antwerp and Antwerp Management School, particularly known for his work on business-to-business marketing and service strategies.

== Biography ==
Vandenbempt studied Applied Economics at the University of Antwerp, where he received his BS magna cum laude in 1991 and his MA in 1996. There in Antwerp he also received his PhD with a thesis entitled "Strategic Reorientation in Content. Case studies in the Dutch Electrotechnical Installation Industry", advised by Rudy Martens, Paul Matthyssens and Philippe Naert.

After graduation Vandenbempt was appointed lecturer of Strategy and Management at University of Antwerp and at the Antwerp Management School. Since 2008 he is Professor of Strategy at the university and business school. At the Antwerp Management School he is also Academic Director EMBA since 2011. He has been Visiting Professor at the James Madison University in the US, the IBS in Moscow and the Goa Institute of Management and Alliance University in the Far-East. In 2010 he was also appointed independent director at the Antwerp World Diamond Centre.

Vandenbempt's research interests focus on "innovation and business strategy in business-to-business markets and on the interrelationship between cognition and strategic action. He also lectures and consults on industrial marketing and strategy issues for industrial companies."

== Publications ==
Vandenbempt authored and co-authored numerous publications in his field of expertise. Books, a selection:

- Paul Matthyssens, Rudy Martens and Koen Vandenbempt (1998) Concurrentiestrategie en marktdynamiek : op weg naar concurrentievoordeel in industriële markten. Deventer : Kluwer BedrijfsInformatie.
- Paul Matthyssens, Koen Vandenbempt, Liselore Berghman (2004) Waardecreatie en innovatie in de industrie : nieuwe denkkaders versus oude gewoonten. Leuven : Acco.

Articles, a selection:

- Matthyssens, Paul, and Koen Vandenbempt. "Creating competitive advantage in industrial services." Journal of Business & Industrial Marketing 13.4/5 (1998): 339–355.
- De Wever, Sigrid, Rudy Martens, and Koen Vandenbempt. "The impact of trust on strategic resource acquisition through interorganizational networks: Towards a conceptual model." Human Relations 58.12 (2005): 1523–1543.
- Berghman, Liselore, Paul Matthyssens, and Koen Vandenbempt. "Building competences for new customer value creation: An exploratory study." Industrial marketing management 35.8 (2006): 961–973.
- Aerts, Kris, Paul Matthyssens, and Koen Vandenbempt. "Critical role and screening practices of European business incubators." Technovation 27.5 (2007): 254–267.
- Matthyssens, Paul, and Koen Vandenbempt. "Moving from basic offerings to value-added solutions: strategies, barriers and alignment." Industrial Marketing Management 37.3 (2008): 316–328.
