= Pragmatic web =

The Pragmatic Web consists of the tools, practices and theories describing why and how people use information. In contrast to the Syntactic Web and Semantic Web the Pragmatic Web is not only about form or meaning of information, but about social interaction which brings about e.g. understanding or commitments.

The transformation of existing information into information relevant to a group of users or an individual user includes the support of how users locate, filter, access, process, synthesize and share information. Social bookmarking is an example of a group tool, end-user programmable agents are examples of individual tools.

The Pragmatic Web idea is rooted in the Language/action perspective.
