= Rudy Martens =

Belgian organizational theorist

Rudy Martens (born ca. 1958) is a Belgian organizational theorist, Professor of Strategic Management and Dean of the Faculty of Applied Economics at the University of Antwerp and at Antwerp Management School, particularly known for his process approach of strategic management.

== Biography ==
Martens received his Licentiate degree (MA) in Applied Economics and Marketing in 1980 from the University of Antwerp, he was Research Associate at [INSEAD] in 1987 and received his PhD back at the University of Antwerp under supervision of André Van Cauwenbergh and Karel Cool.

After his graduation Martens was appointed Professor of Strategic Management at the University of Antwerp in 1993, and Professor at the Antwerp Management School since 2000. At the University of Antwerp he was vice-dean of the Faculty of Applied Economics from 2006 to 2011, and dean since 2011.

== Publications ==
Martens authored and co-authored numerous publications in his field of expertise. Books, a selection:

- 1994. Strategy as a situational puzzle: the fit of components. Ilse Bogaert, Rudy Martens, and Andre Van Cauwenbergh.
- 1994. Asset stocks, strategic groups and rivalry. Karel Cool, Ingemar Dierickx, and Rudy Martens.
- 1998. Concurrentiestrategie en marktdynamiek : op weg naar concurrentievoordeel in industriële markten. With Paul Matthyssens, Rudy Martens, and Koen Vandenbempt. Deventer : Kluwer BedrijfsInformatie

Articles, a selection:

- Van Cauwenbergh, André, et al. "On the role and function of formal analysis in strategic investment decision processes: results from an empirical study in Belgium." Management Accounting Research 7.2 (1996): 169–184.
- Jorissen, A., Laveren, E., Martens, R., & Reheul, A. M. (2005). Real Versus Sample‐Based Differences in Comparative Family Business Research. Family Business Review, 18(3), 229–246.
- De Wever, Sigrid, Rudy Martens, and Koen Vandenbempt. "The impact of trust on strategic resource acquisition through interorganizational networks: Towards a conceptual model." Human Relations 58.12 (2005): 1523–1543.
