= Robert Van Straelen =

Belgian economist and organizational theorist

Robert Alphonse Paul (Bob) Van Straelen (born 3 December 1934) is a Belgian economist and organizational theorist, and emeritus Professor at the Antwerp Management School, known for his work on large empirical macroeconomic models.

== Biography ==
Robert Van Straelen was born in Borgerhout to Paul Verstraelen, Director of the Banque Belgolaise in Antwerp, and Leopoldina Vinsolest from Borgerhout. Van Straelen attended the St. Edmondus Institute in Antwerp, and the St. Jan Berchmanscollege. In 1952 he started to study at the Sint-Ignatius Handelshogeschool (later part of the University of Antwerp), where in 1957 he received his degree cum laude. In 1958 he received another degree and a Special Licence at the Katholieke Universiteit Leuven. There in 1968 he was granted a colloquium doctum and in 1971 received his PhD in Economics with a thesis entitled "Prijsontwikkeling en produktiestructuur: proeve tot formulering van een stochastisch model voor produktiecoëfficiënten."

In 1959 Van Straelen started his career in industry as business economist at a chemical company in Antwerp. The same year Fernand Nédée (1930–1980), later the founder of the University Institution Antwerp, invited him to join the research center "Studiecentrum voor de Expansie van Antwerpen". In 1961 he started as director of the new department of econometrics at the Sint-Ignatius Handelshogeschool. In 1963 he also succeeded Vic van Rompuy as lecturer, and was appointed member of the Federal Planning Bureau in Brussels.

In 1968 Van Straelen became associate professor at the Faculty for Applied Economics at the Katholieke Universiteit Leuven. Later he was appointed Professor at the Department of Applied Economics at the University of Antwerp and at the Antwerp Management School. There in 1996 he initiated a study of Real estate.

Van Straelen was elected fellow at the Royal Institution of Chartered Surveyors.

== Selected publications ==
Books, a selection:

- Van Straelen, Robert and Pierre-Henri Virenque. De input-output analyse : een methode voor het kwantitatief onderzoek der economische structuur. Leuven: Studiecentrum voor economisch en sociaal onderzoek Sint-Ignatius, S.C.I.S. Economische Schriften
- Van Straelen, Robert Alphonse Paul. Prijsontwikkeling en produktiestructuur: proeve tot formulering van een stochastisch model voor produktiecoëfficiënten. Diss. Katholieke Universiteit, 1971.
- Van Straelen, Robert. "Bouwactiviteit: verklaring en voorspelling." (1995).
- Van Straelen, Robert. "Trendberekening door middel van Excel." (2001).

Articles, a selection:

- De Grauwe, P., Kennes, W., Peeters, T., & Van Straelen, R. (1979). Trade expansion with the less developed countries and employment: A case study of Belgium. Weltwirtschaftliches Archiv, 115(1), 99–115.
- van Straelen, Robert. "Econometrie: een terugblik op een turbulente ontwikkeling." (2001).
