= Wim Van Grembergen =

Belgian organizational theorist

Willy (Wim) Van Grembergen (born 1947) is a Belgian organizational theorist and Professor of Information Systems Management at the University of Antwerp, and Academic Director of the IT Alignment and Governance Research Institute, known for his work on IT governance.

== Biography ==
Van Grembergen received his PhD in Applied Economics. After graduation he started his academic career as a guest professor at the Katholieke Universiteit Leuven. He was a faculty member at Stellenbosch University and the Institute of Business Studies in Moscow.

Back at the University of Antwerp in the early 1980s, Van Grembergen started as a lecturer in business informatics and academic coordinator of the IT-audit master's programs. He was Academic Director of the MBA Program from 1989 to 1995. He was later appointed Professor of Information Systems Management and Chair of the Information Systems Management Department at the University of Antwerp, Economics and Management Faculty. Among his PhD students was Steven De Haes. He was also associated with the Antwerp Management School.

== Publications ==
Van Grembergen has authored and co-authored many publications in the fields of business/IT alignment, governance and performance management. Selected books:

- Michel Daulie and Willy Van Grembergen. Ontwikkeling van administratieve systemen in BASIC. Malle : De Sikkel. 1985.
- Van Grembergen, Wim, ed. Strategies for information technology governance. Igi Global, 2004.
- Van Grembergen, Wim. "Enterprise governance of information technology: Achieving strategic alignment and value", Springer, 2009.

Selected articles:

- Van Grembergen, Wim, and Rik Van Bruggen. "Measuring and improving corporate information technology through the balanced scorecard." The Electronic Journal of Information Systems Evaluation 1.1 (1997).
- Van Grembergen, Wim, Steven De Haes, and Erik Guldentops. "Structures, processes and relational mechanisms for IT governance." Strategies for information technology governance 2.004 (2004): 1-36.
- De Haes, Steven, and Wim Van Grembergen. "IT governance structures, processes and relational mechanisms: achieving IT/business alignment in a major Belgian financial group." System Sciences, 2005. HICSS'05. Proceedings of the 38th Annual Hawaii International Conference on System Sciences. IEEE, 2005.
