= Erik Guldentops =

Belgian computer scientist

Erik Guldentops (born ca. 1941) is a Belgian computer scientist and management consultant, who was systems engineer at SWIFT and Executive Professor at Antwerp Management School, known for his work on IT governance.

== Biography ==
Guldentops started his Humanities study at the 1960 Onze-Lieve-Vrouwcollege in Antwerpen, where he graduated in economics in 1967. In 1969 he proceeded to study Computer science at the Karel De Grote Hogeschool, where he graduated in 1971. Subsequently after another year at the Katholieke Universiteit Leuven, he received a Post-graduate degree in computer science.

Guldentops started his career at the Society for Worldwide Interbank Financial Telecommunication (SWIFT) in 1974 as Chief Inspector, and was Director Information Security from 1996 to 2001. From 1993 to 2001 he was also Vice President Research at the ISACA (Information Systems Audit and Control Association). In 1998 he was appointed Executive Professor at the Antwerp Management School. Since his retired in 2010, he is Visiting Lecturer at the Antwerp Management School. In 2009 he also had started his own consultancy firm. Guldentops has been member of the International Federation for Information Processing IFIP TC11 WG11.5.

In 2000 Guldentops received the 2000 J.Lainhart Award for "his impact on the profession’s Common Body of Knowledge", and in 2005 the J.Wasserman Award for "his overall contribution to the IT Audit profession."

== Selected publications ==
Guldentops authored and co-authored several publications. Books:

- 2002. Integrity, internal control and security in information systems : connecting governance and technology : IFIP TC11/WG11.5 fourth working conference on integrity and internal control in information systems, November 15–16, 2001, Brussels, Belgium. With Michael Gertz and Leon Strous (eds.)

Articles, a selection:

- Van Grembergen, Wim, Steven De Haes, and Erik Guldentops. "Structures, processes and relational mechanisms for IT governance." Strategies for information technology governance 2.004 (2004): 1-36.
