= Hans van Vliet =

Dutch computer scientist

Johannes Cornelis (Hans) van Vliet (born 12 September 1949, Mijdrecht) is a Dutch computer scientist and Professor Emeritus of Software Engineering at the Vrije Universiteit Amsterdam, known for his work in quantitative aspects of software engineering.

Van Vliet received his MA in Mathematics at the Vrije Universiteit, and in 1979 his PhD in Computer Science at the University of Amsterdam. After 1979 he started his career as researcher at the Centrum Wiskunde & Informatica (National Research Institute for Mathematics and Computer Science), and in the year 1983-84 was visiting scientist at the IBM Research Laboratory in San Jose. Since 1987 he is professor of Software Engineering at the Vrije Universiteit. Since 2007 he is member of the IFIP WG 2.10, and chaired the ESEC/FSE conference on Software Engineering in 2009 in Amsterdam.

== Publications ==
Books, a selection:

- Hans van Vliet. Software engineering. Stenfert Kroese, 1988 (in Dutch)
- Hans van Vliet. Software Engineering: Principles and Practice Wiley, 1993, 1996, 2000, 2003, 2007.

Articles, a selection:

- Hans van Vliet, Jaap Gordijn and Hans Akkermans. "Business modelling is not process modelling." in: Conceptual modeling for e-business and the web. Springer Berlin Heidelberg, 2000. p. 40-51.
- Hans van Vliet, Hans de Bruin. "Scenario-based generation and evaluation of software architectures." in: Generative and Component-Based Software Engineering. Springer Berlin Heidelberg, 2001. p. 128-139
- Hans van Vliet, PerOlof Bengtsson et al. "Architecture-level modifiability analysis (ALMA)." in: Journal of Systems and Software Vol 69 (1), 2004. p. 129-147.
- Greefhorst, Danny, Henk Koning, and Hans van Vliet. "The many faces of architectural descriptions." Information Systems Frontiers 8.2 (2006): 103–113.
- Hans van Vliet, Philippe Kruchten and Patricia Lago. "Building up and reasoning about architectural knowledge." in: Quality of Software Architectures. Springer Berlin Heidelberg, 2006. p. 43-58.
- Hans van Vliet, Remco C. de Boer. "On the similarity between requirements and architecture". in: Journal of Systems and Software Vol 82 (3). 2009. p. 544-550.
