= Danny Greefhorst =

Dutch enterprise architect (born 1972)

Danny Greefhorst (born 31 December 1972) is a Dutch enterprise architect and consultant at ArchiXL, known for his work in the field of enterprise architecture.

== Biography ==
Greefhorst obtained his master in computer science at Utrecht University in 1995 with the master thesis ""A Simulation Environment for Ariadne." Furthermore, he became IBM Certified Senior IT Architect in 2004. He is TOGAF 9 level 2 and ArchiMate 2.0 certified.

After graduation Greefhorst started his career at the Software Engineering Research Centre in Utrecht in 1995. He worked in various roles from software researcher, designer, architect, developer, tester and webmaster to class instructor, coach, seminar organiser, and IT consultant, and published his first papers. In 2001 he moved to IBM, where he became Senior IT Architect for five years. After another year as Principal Consultant at the management consultancy firm Yellowtail, he started his own enterprise architecture consultancy firm named ArchiXL.

Since 2010 Greefhorst chairs the governing board of Via Nova Architectura, and since 2014 also chairs the governing board of the Special Interest Group on architecture of the Dutch Computer Society Ngi-NGN. In 2011 he received a medal of honor from the Dutch Architecture Forum for his contributions to the Dutch enterprise architecture community.

== Work ==
=== Architecture Principles, 2011 ===
In "Architecture Principles – The Cornerstones of Enterprise Architecture," (2011) Greefhorst and Proper present an extensive study of architecture principles. They presume that "enterprises, from small to large, evolve continuously. As a result, their structures are transformed and extended continuously. Without some means of control, such changes are bound to lead to an overly complex, uncoordinated and heterogeneous environment that is hard to manage and hard to adapt to future changes. Enterprise architecture principles provide a means to direct transformations of enterprises. As a consequence, architecture principles should be seen as the cornerstones of any architecture."

Furthermore, they argue, that this work "provide[s] both a theoretical and a practical perspective on architecture principles. The theoretical perspective involves a brief survey of the general concept of principle as well as an analysis of different flavors of principles. Architecture principles are regarded as a specific class of normative principles that direct the design of an enterprise, from the definition of its business to its supporting IT. The practical perspective on architecture principles is concerned with an approach to the formulation of architecture principles, as well as their actual use in organizations."

== Publications ==
Danny Greefhorst has authored and co-authored numerous publications in the fields of enterprise architecture, software engineering and IT. The books he has co-authored:

- Peter Beijer, Danny Greefhorst, Rob Kruijk, Martijn Sasse, Robert Slagter. Ruimte voor mens en organisatie - Visie en aanpak voor de digitale samenleving, BIM Media B.V., Den Haag, 2014.
- Danny Greefhorst, Erik Proper. Architecture Principles – The Cornerstones of Enterprise Architecture, 1st Edition, Springer, 2011.

Articles, a selection:

- Florijn, Gert, Timo Besamusca, and Danny Greefhorst. "Ariadne and HOPLa: flexible coordination of collaborative processes." Coordination Languages and Models. Springer Berlin Heidelberg, 1996. 197-214.
- Bosch, J., Florijn, G., Greefhorst, D., Kuusela, J., Obbink, J. H., & Pohl, K. (2002). "Variability issues in software product lines." In Software Product-Family Engineering (pp. 13–21). Springer Berlin Heidelberg.
- Greefhorst, Danny, Henk Koning, and Hans van Vliet. "The many faces of architectural descriptions." Information Systems Frontiers 8.2 (2006): 103-113.
- Angelov, Samuil, P. W. P. J. Grefen, and Danny Greefhorst. "A classification of software reference architectures: Analyzing their success and effectiveness." Software Architecture, 2009 & European Conference on Software Architecture. WICSA/ECSA 2009. Joint Working IEEE/IFIP Conference on. IEEE, 2009.
- Proper, Erik, and Danny Greefhorst. "The roles of principles in enterprise architecture." Trends in Enterprise Architecture Research. Springer Berlin Heidelberg, 2010. 57-70.
