= Marc Vael =

- Born: 30 July 1967 (age 59); Sint-Niklaas, Sint-Niklaas
- Citizenship: Belgian
- Known for: IT Audit, Business Continuity
- Scientific career
- Fields: Computer science
- Workplaces: Antwerp Management School; Solvay Brussels

Marc Vael (born 30 July 1967) is a Belgian computer scientist, business executive, lecturer, and author in IT risks and business continuity.

== Biography ==
Born in Sint-Niklaas, Vael received his MA in applied economics in 1989 from the University of Antwerp, and another MA in information management in 1990 from the University of Hasselt, and a master-doctorandus degree in applied economics and ICT in 1991 from the Katholieke Universiteit Leuven. He later received certificates in systems auditing, risk and information systems control et al.

In 1997 Vael started to lecture as guest professor at the Antwerp Management School, and since 2004 also at the Solvay Brussels School of Economics and Management. In 2010 Vael was appointed chief audit executive at Smals., and also deputy member of the Flemish privacy commission. In 2012 Vael was appointed as member of the Permanent Stakeholder Group of ENISA.

In 2012 Vael was elected international vice-president and became a member of the board of ISACA where he was responsible for knowledge management. The same year he was also elected Fellow van het Hogeheuvelcollege (2012), University of Leuven

== Publications ==
Vael has authored and co-authored numerous publications in his fields of interests. A selection:

- 2006. Information Security Governance 2nd edition (co-author)
- 2010. Security Information and Event Management (SIEM) (co-author) ISACA SIEM white paper co-author (2010)
- 2012. Cloud Computing approach Business.telenet.be
- 2012. Privacy = own responsibility at Ictnews.be
- 2012. Vertrouwen als spil van de cloudstrategie at solutions-magazine.com
- 2012. Hidden costs of cloud migration at Bcifiles.co
- 2013. Belgian Cybersecurity Guide at FEB/ICC
- 2015. Continuiteit in de publieke sector at Vandenbroele
