= Engineering administration =

Engineering administration (EA) is a branch of engineering that is mainly concerned with the analysis and solution of operational and management problems using scientific and mathematical methods. Engineering administration is considered to be a subdiscipline of industrial engineering and systems engineering.

== University programs ==
=== Undergraduate curriculum ===
In the United States, the undergraduate degree earned is the Bachelor of Science (B.S.) in Engineering Administration.

=== Postgraduate curriculum ===
In the United States, the postgraduate degree earned is the Master of Science (M.Sc.) in Engineering Administration (MEA).

== Associations ==
- INFORMS
- Institute of Industrial Engineers

== See also ==
- Industrial engineering
- Systems engineering
- Enterprise engineering
- Engineering management
- Business engineering
