= Herwig Mannaert =

Belgian computer scientist (born 1965)

Herwig Mannaert (born April 23, 1965) is a Belgian academic and Professor at the University of Antwerp, Dean of the Management Information Systems Department, and Executive Professor at the University of Antwerp Management School, known for his work on digital image processing, software architecture, and open source software.

== Biography ==
Mannaert received his Msc in Electrical Engineer in 1988 from the Katholieke Universiteit Leuven, where in 1993 he also received his PhD for a thesis on the "design of object recognition algorithms for image interpretation."

After his graduation in 1993 the University of Antwerp appointed Mannaert Associate Professor at the Management Information Systems Department. From 1998 to 2000 he was lead developer at the Society for Worldwide Interbank Financial Telecommunication (SWIFT), directing the developed of a new secure communication software system. Since 2000 is founding director of Cast4All, that supply scalable and transactional software management systems. At the University of Antwerp he is appointed Professor and Dean of the Management Information Systems Department, and Executive Professor at the University of Antwerp Management School.

His research interests are in the field of evolvable software architectures, and particularly e-learning technologies and open source software.

== Publications ==
Mannaert authored and co-authored many publications in his field of expertise. Books:

- Patrick Wambacq, Herwig Mannaert. Handboek signaalverwerking: numerieke frequentieanalyse, stochastische signalen en digitaal filterontwerp. Acco, 1998.
- Herwig Mannaert, Herbert Peremans. Kijk op elektronica. ACCO, 2005
- Mannaert, Herwig, and Jan Verelst. Normalized systems: re-creating information technology based on laws for software evolvability. (2009).

Articles, a selection:

- Ven, Kris, Jan Verelst, and Herwig Mannaert. "Should you adopt open source software?." IEEE Software 25.3 (2008): 54-59.
- Mannaert, Herwig, Jan Verelst, and Kris Ven. "Towards evolvable software architectures based on systems theoretic stability." Software: Practice and Experience 42.1 (2012): 89-116.
