= Ramon O'Callaghan =

Spanish engineer (born 1954)

Ramón O'Callaghan (born 1954) is a Spanish organizational theorist, emeritus professor of information systems and innovation management at the Tilburg University, former dean of Porto Business School, at the University of Porto in Porto, Portugal, and current President of Gisma University of Applied Sciences in Potsdam and Berlin, Germany. He is particularly known for his work on electronic data interchange.

== Biography ==
Born 1954, O'Callaghan received an engineer's degree from the Universitat Politècnica de Catalunya in 1976, an MBA from IESE Business School in 1983, and a Doctor of Business Administration from Harvard Business School in 1989.

O'Callaghan started his academic career as researcher at the Cybernetics Institute of the Universitat Politècnica de Catalunya in 1976. From 1977 to 1989, he spend time in industry with Texas Instruments as sales engineer and project manager; at Codorníu Winery as controller; at Harvard Business School as researcher; and at the management consulting firm Institut Cerdà as director. Back in Spain in 1989 he became associate professor at the IESE Business School.

In 1994, he moved to the Netherlands to the Nyenrode Business Universiteit, where he became director of the MBA program. From 1997 to 2013, he was professor of information systems at Tilburg University. There he also directed the MBA program, and other masters programs for some years, and was dean of the TIAS School for Business and Society from 2009 to 2012 as successor of Philippe Naert. He was also associated with the Open University of Catalonia and the Universidad de Deusto. From 2013 to 2015, he was dean of the graduate school of business at Nazarbayev University.

== Selected publications ==
O'Callaghan has published numerous articles in the field of strategic management of technology. Books, a selection:

- 1995, EDI in Europe : how it works in practice. With Helmut Krcmar and Niels Bjørn-Andersen. Chichester; New York : Wiley. ISBN 978-0-471-95354-8.
- 2005. Transforming enterprise : the economic and social implications of information technology. With William H. Dutton, Brian Kahin, and Andrew W. Wyckoff (eds). Cambridge, Mass. : MIT Press. ISBN 978-0-262-54177-0.

Articles, a selection:

- O'Callaghan, Ramon, Patrick J. Kaufmann, and Benn R. Konsynski. "Adoption correlates and share effects of electronic data interchange systems in marketing channels." The Journal of Marketing (1992): 45-56.
- O'Callaghan, Ramon, and Jon A. Turner. "Electronic Data Interchange Concepts and Issues." (1995).
- Peterson, Ryan R., Ramon O'Callaghan, and Piet Ribbers. "Information technology governance by design: investigating hybrid configurations and integration mechanisms." Proceedings of the twenty first international conference on Information systems. Association for Information Systems, 2000.
