= Paul Matthyssens =

Paul Matthyssens (born 1955) is a Belgian organizational theorist, management consultant, and Professor in Strategic Management and Global Strategic Management at the University of Antwerp, Department of Management, and at the Antwerp Management School. known for his work of service-oriented strategy. Since his retirement in 2020 from the Antwerp Management School, Paul Matthyssens is Professor of Management at the Department of Economics, Management and Statistics of the University of Milano-Bicocca.

== Biography ==
Born in Wilrijk, Matthyssens in 1980 received his PhD in marketing (special licence) from Ghent University with a thesis entitled "Marktbewerking voor industriële produkten." (Marketing of industrial products).

Matthyssens started his academic career in 1982 as faculty member of the Antwerp Management School of the University of Antwerp. He is appointed Professor of strategic management and global strategic management, and chaired the Department of Management of the University of Antwerp from 2007 to 2013, and is since September 2013 Dean of the Antwerp Management School as successor of Philippe Naert. Among his PhD students is Koen Vandenbempt (PhD 1999).

From 1994 to 2008 he was also Professor of Business-to-Business Marketing at the Erasmus University Rotterdam. He has also been visiting professor at the Copenhagen Business School, and at the Stockholm School of Economics, and lectured at numerous other universities.

== Work ==
Matthyssens' research interests focuses on "strategic buyer-supplier relations, value creation strategies, market strategy and strategic innovation in international and business-to-business markets."

== Publications ==
Matthyssens has authored and co-authored numerous books and articles. Books, a selection:

- 1998. Concurrentiestrategie en marktdynamiek : op weg naar concurrentievoordeel in industriële markten. Paul Matthyssens, Rudy Martens, Koen Vandenbempt. Deventer : Kluwer BedrijfsInformatie
- 2000. Marketingcommunicatie in zakelijke markten : strategische en geïntegreerde communicatie voor business-to-business-marketeers. Marc Logman, Paul Matthyssens, W. Fred van Raaij. Alphen aan den Rijn : Samsom
- 2002. Stakeholder Synergie : vijfentwintigste Vlaams wetenschappelijk economisch congres, Hasselt, 14 maart 2002. Ludo Peeters, Paul Matthyssens en Lode Vereeck (eds.) Leuven; Apeldoorn : Garant
- 2004. Waardecreatie en innovatie in de industrie : nieuwe denkkaders versus oude gewoonten. Paul Matthyssens, Koen Vandenbempt, Liselore Berghman. Leuven : Acco

Articles, a selection:

- Matthyssens, Paul, and Christophe Van den Bulte. "Getting closer and nicer: partnerships in the supply chain." Long Range Planning 27.1 (1994): 72–83.
- Matthyssens, Paul, and Koen Vandenbempt. "Creating competitive advantage in industrial services." Journal of Business & Industrial Marketing 13.4/5 (1998): 339–355.
- Axinn, Catherine N., and Paul Matthyssens. "Limits of internationalization theories in an unlimited world." International marketing review 19.5 (2002): 436–449.
- Aerts, Kris, Paul Matthyssens, and Koen Vandenbempt. "Critical role and screening practices of European business incubators." Technovation 27.5 (2007): 254–267.
- Matthyssens, Paul, and Koen Vandenbempt. "Moving from basic offerings to value-added solutions: strategies, barriers and alignment." Industrial Marketing Management 37.3 (2008): 316–328.
