= Antwerp Management School =

Belgian business school

- Type: Business School
- Established: 1959
- Parent institution: University of Antwerp
- Dean: Steven De Haes (since October 1, 2018)
- Director: Ilse Daelman (Since 2020)
- Location: Antwerp, Belgium; 51°13′14.3″N 4°24′38.7″E
- Campus: Main Campus "De Boogkeers" Antwerp Campus Business Design & Innovation Kortrijk Campus Smart Mobility Diepenbeek
- Website: www.antwerpmanagementschool.be

The Antwerp Management School (Dutch: Antwerp Management School) is the University of Antwerp's autonomous business school. It is located in the historical center of the city of Antwerp.

The school offers eight full-time master programs and more than sixty short or long-term executive programs on a variety of subjects. The majority of students at Antwerp Management School come from abroad, which reflects the global perspective of the school. Additionally, the school has strong ties with many Chinese institutions.

== History ==
Antwerp Management School was established in 1959 as the "Instituut voor Postuniversitair Onderwijs (IPO)". In 2000, the school changed its name to Antwerp Management School and became an independent organization within the University of Antwerp. All postgraduate management programs and management master programs from the University of Antwerp were transferred to Antwerp Management School.

== Accreditations ==
=== International Accreditations ===
Antwerp Management School is one of two Triple Crown business schools in Belgium and possesses accreditation by:

==== AACSB ====
The University of Antwerp is accredited by the Association to Advance Collegiate Schools of Business (AACSB) for its economic programs at the Faculty of Business and Economics and Antwerp Management School and was the first Belgian university to acquire this accreditation. With over 500 accredited members (about 60 outside of the US), AACSB is the oldest (1916).

==== AMBA ====
In 2015, Antwerp Management School obtained the AMBA accreditation for their Executive MBA in association with IBS.

==== EQUIS ====
The University of Antwerp – Faculty of Business and Economics, including all activities of the Antwerp Management School (AMS), has been awarded the prestigious EQUIS accreditation for the first time in 2023.

=== Regional Accreditation ===
==== NVAO ====
The Antwerp Management School master trainings have been accredited by the Dutch-Flemish Accreditation Organisation (NVAO) on the basis of the AACSB- accreditation. With this NVAO acknowledgment on the basis of an already acquired international accreditation, the University of Antwerp is a firstling among the Belgian universities.

== Location ==
The Antwerp Management School is located in the historical center of the city of Antwerp, within walking distance to other university campuses.

In the year 2000, after an award-winning renovation, a 15th-century mansion called ‘Het Brantijser’ became the new home of the Management School. The architect and principal have been awarded with the Europa Nostra Award for the combination of the historical foundations and the modern interpretation.

In 2018, the Antwerp Management School moved to the Boogkeers, former OCMW building at the Mechelseplein.

== Organisation and Faculty Members ==
=== General Council ===
- Christian Leysen, Chairman
- Steven De Haes, Dean since 1 September 2018

Formerly part of the General Council:

- Philippe Naert, Former Dean (2009-2012) and Former Dean of INSEAD
- Paul Matthyssens, Former Dean (2013-2018)

=== Faculty ===
- Jamie Anderson
- Yuri Bobbert
- Bart Cambré
- Wim Van Grembergen
- Erik Guldentops
- Jan Hoogervorst
- Herwig Mannaert
- Rudy Martens
- Hans Mulder
- Martin Op ’t Land
- Marc Vael
- Lou Van Beirendonck
- Robert Van Straelen
- Koen Vandenbempt
- Jan Vanthienen
- Jan Verelst

== Notable alumni ==
- Jo Cornu, CEO of the National Railway Company of Belgium
- Bert De Graeve, Chief Executive Officer (CEO) and Chairman of Bekaert
