= Harry Peeters =

Dutch historian and psychologist

Henricus Franciscus Maria (Harry) Peeters (3 October 1931 – 17 November 2012) was a Dutch historian and psychologist, Emeritus Professor of Historical Psychology at the Tilburg University, and founder dean of the TIAS School for Business and Society (TIAS) in 1982 and for his work on European historical psychology.

== Biography ==
Born in Venray, Peeters received his MA in history and psychology at the Radboud University Nijmegen. A renowned professor at the university was Jan Hendrik van den Berg, who had stated that in history children, were regarded as little adults. Peeters questioned this, and won a scholarship to do PhD research in Paris. Back in Nijmegen in 1966 he received his PhD with the thesis entitled "Kind en jeugdige in het begin van de moderne tijd (ca. 1500-ca.1650)".

After graduation Peeters worked as a history teacher and in industry for some years. Early 1970s he joined the faculty of the Tilburg University, to facilitate the newly initiated psychology study. In 1972 he was appointed Professor of Historical Psychology. At the Tilburg University with industry funding, he founded the Tilburg Institute of Advanced Studies (since 2014 TIAS School for Business and Society) for postgraduate management education, which he chaired until his retirement in 1996.

In 2011 Peeters was awarded a knighthood in the Order of Orange-Nassau.

== Selected publications ==
Peeters authored and co-authored several publications.

- 1966. Kind en jeugdige in het begin van de moderne tijd. Ca 1500-ca 1650. Doctoral thesis, Radboud University Nijmegen.
- 1978. Historische gedragswetenschap. Een bijdrage tot de studie van menselijk gedrag op lange termijn. Meppel : Boom.
- 1988. Vijf eeuwen gezinsleven: liefde, huwelijk en opvoeding in Nederland. With Lène Dresen-Coenders and Ton Brandenburg.
- 1994. Hoe veranderlijk is de mens. Een inleiding in de historische psychologie.
- 1996. Psychology: the historical dimension. Tilburg : Syntax Publishers
- 1997. Europe in transition. With Mario Tonveronachi eds. Tilburg : Tilburg University Press
