= Yuri Bobbert =

Dutch cybersecurity executive, academic, and entrepreneur

- Born: 1973 (age 52–53)
- Education: Utrecht University; University of Antwerp; Radboud University Nijmegen
- Occupations: cybersecurity executive, academic, and entrepreneur
- Employer: Antwerp Management School
- Awards: ISACA Global Inspirational Leadership Award

Yuri Bobbert (born 1973) is a Dutch cybersecurity executive, academic, and entrepreneur. He holds dual doctorates from the University of Antwerp and Radboud University Nijmegen in business information security, and is a professor in the executive education programme at Antwerp Management School (AMS). In 2025, ISACA presented him, as the first Dutch person, with its Global Inspirational Leadership Award.

== Education ==
Bobbert completed a Master's and a bachelor's degree in Informatics at Utrecht University of Applied Sciences before earning a PhD in Applied Economics from the University of Antwerp and a PhD in Information System Science from Radboud University Nijmegen, both conferred in 2018.^{[1]} His dissertation, titled Improving the Maturity of Business Information Security, examined the design of a software tool to connect strategic security goals to operational management processes.

== Career ==
Bobbert served for a decade as CEO of B-ABLE, a risk consulting and security technology firm. He later served as interim CISO at UWV, the Dutch public employment services agency, and then as Global Group Chief Security Officer at NN Group, where he led the integration of NN Group's and Delta Lloyd's security, risk, and compliance functions following their merger. In October 2019, he joined ON2IT, a Netherlands-based managed cybersecurity service provider, as Global Chief Security Officer.

In 2018, he co-founded Meetingwizard, a software-as-a-service company. In 2023, he founded Anove International.

Bobbert has been a professor at Antwerp Management School and the University of Antwerp since 2016 and has served as academic director of its Executive Master's in IT Risk and Cybersecurity Management programme since 2017.

== Research ==
Bobbert's research focuses on business strategy, digital, business information security (BIS) governance, risk management, and security strategy alignment, primarily using Design Science Research (DSR) methods. A second major strand concerns Group Decision Support System research, Zero Trust cybersecurity frameworks, CyberTech, and RegTech, including their design, empirical validation, and compliance alignment.

== Selected publications ==
=== Books ===
- Bobbert, Y. (2010). Maturing Business Information Security. ISBN 978-90-90-28711-9
- Bobbert, Y. (2013) Hoe veilig is mijn aandeel. ISBN 978-90-90-28711-9
- Bobbert, Y. and Papelard-Agteres, T. (2018). Critical Success Factors in Business Information Security. Uitgeverij Dialoog. ISBN 978-94-6126-322-3
- Bobbert, Y. & Broersma, M. (2018) Cybersecurity in 60 Minutes ISBN 978-94-6126-318-6
- Bobbert, Y. et al. (2021). Strategic Approaches to Digital Platform Security Assurance. IGI Global. ISBN 978-1-7998-7367-9
- Bobbert, Y. and Butterhoff, M. (2020). Leading in Digital Security. Bitti B.V. ISBN 978-90-90-33513-1
- Bobbert, Y. and Mulder, H. (2022). 25 Years of Group Support Systems.
- Bobbert, Helvoirt, Migeon (2024). Implementing DORA in Fintech

=== Peer-reviewed journal articles ===
- Bobbert, Y. (2015). "Porter's Elements for a Business Information Security Strategy." ISACA Journal, vol. 1.
- Bobbert, Y. (2016). "Boardroom Dynamics: Group Support for the Board's Involvement in a Smart Security Decision-making Process." ISACA Journal, vol. 5.
- Bobbert, Y. and Papelard-Agteres, T. (2018). "Never Waste a Good Information Security Incident: An Explorative Study into Critical Success Factors." ISACA Journal, vol. 3.

=== Peer-reviewed conference papers ===
- Bobbert, Y. and Mulder, H. (2013). "Group Support Systems Research in the Field of Business Information Security: A Practitioner's View." Proceedings of the 46th Hawaii International Conference on System Sciences (HICSS 2013). IEEE. pp. 589–598.
- Bobbert, Y. and Mulder, H. (2019). "Enterprise Engineering in Business Information Security." In Advances in Enterprise Engineering XII (EEWC 2018). Lecture Notes in Business Information Processing, vol. 334. Springer, Cham.
- Bobbert, Y. and Scheerder, J. (2021). "On the Design and Engineering of a Zero Trust Security Artefact." In Advances in Information and Communication (FICC 2021). Advances in Intelligent Systems and Computing, vol. 1363. Springer, Cham.
- Bobbert, Y. and Scheerder, J. (2022). "Zero Trust Validation: from Practice to Theory." 29th Annual IEEE Software Technology Conference (STC 2022). IEEE.
- Migeon, J.H. and Bobbert, Y. (2022). "Leveraging Zero Trust Security Strategy to Facilitate Compliance to Data Protection Regulations." In Intelligent Computing (SAI 2022). Lecture Notes in Networks and Systems, vol. 508. Springer, Cham.
- Bobbert, Y., Scheerder, J. and Timmermans, T. (2022). "Perspectives from 50+ Years' Practical Zero Trust Experience and Learnings on Buyer Expectations and Industry Promises." In Intelligent Computing (SAI 2022). Lecture Notes in Networks and Systems, vol. 508. Springer, Cham.
- Bobbert, Y. (2023). "On the Empirical Validation of a Zero Trust Security Framework via Group Support System Research." In Proceedings of the Future Technologies Conference (FTC) 2022, vol. 2. Lecture Notes in Networks and Systems, vol. 560. Springer, Cham.
- Bobbert, Y. and Timmermans, T. (2024). "Zero Trust and Compliance with Industry Frameworks and Regulations." In Advances in Information and Communication (FICC 2024). Lecture Notes in Networks and Systems, vol. 921. Springer, Cham.
