= Philippe Naert =

British organizational theorist

Philippe Autor Naert (born 1943) is a Belgian organizational theorist, and Executive at several business schools and universities from INSEAD to the Antwerp Management School., known for his work on marketing decision modelling.

== Biography ==
Naert received his MS in electrical engineering in 1967 from the Katholieke Universiteit Leuven (Belgium), a Post Graduate degree in Management Science in 1967 from the University of Manchester, and his PhD in Business Administration in 1990 from the Samuel Curtis Johnson Graduate School of Management at the Cornell University.

After graduation Naert was researcher and Professor for some time, when he discovered his passion for business school management. His career as Business School executive started as Dean of the European Institute for Advanced Studies in Management in Brussels. From 1986 to 1990 he was Dean of INSEAD together with Claude Rameau. After two years as Dean at the Instituto Universitario Euroforum Escorial (IUEE) in Spain, he was Dean at Nyenrode Business Universiteit from 1992 to 1996, and from 1996 to 2009 Dean of TiasNimbas Business School, where was succeeded by Ramon O’Callaghan. And from 2009 to 2013 he was Dean of the Antwerp Management School, where is succeeded by Paul Matthyssens. In 2013 Naert jointed the Oxford Policy Management as Non-executive Director. He has also been board member of numerous other organizations.

In 2012 Naert is awarded a Lifetime Achievement Award by the Belgian Stichting Marketing (Stima).

== Work ==
Naert's research interests has been in the areas of "strategy, strategic marketing, quantitative analysis for marketing decisions and globalization."

== Selected publications ==
Naert has authored and co-authored numerous publications. Books, a selection:

- Naert, Philippe A., and Peter Leeflang. Building implementable marketing models. Leiden,, Netherlands: Martinus Nijhoff Social Sciences Division, 1978.
- Naert, Philippe A. Building models for marketing decisions. Vol. 9. Springer, 2000.

Articles, a selection:

- Naert, Philippe A., and Alain Bultez. "Logically consistent market share models." Journal of Marketing Research 10.3 (1973): 334-340.
- Lambin, Jean-Jacques, Philippe A. Naert, and Alain Bultez. "Optimal marketing behavior in oligopoly." European Economic Review 6.2 (1975): 105-128.
- Bultez, Alain, and Philippe Naert. "SH. ARP: shelf allocation for retailers' profit." Marketing Science 7.3 (1988): 211-231.
