= Jamie Anderson (scientist) =

Australian organizational theorist

- Born: 1971 (age 54–55); Australia
- Education: BA, University of Melbourne; MA, University of Melbourne; MBA, London Business School; Honorary Doctorate, RISEBA University
- Occupations: Organizational theorist, professor, keynote speaker
- Employer: Antwerp Management School
- Known for: Strategic innovation, leadership and change
- Notable work: The Fine Art of Success
- Title: Professor of Strategic Management
- Website: jamieandersononline.com

Jamie Anderson (born 1971) is an Australian organizational theorist, keynote speaker, and Professor at the Antwerp Management School, known for his work on Strategic Innovation.

Jamie Anderson has been named as a "management guru" in the Financial Times, and as one of the world's top 25 management thinkers by the journal Business Strategy Review, alongside Gary Hamel, Philip Kotler and Henry Mintzberg and others.

== Biography ==
Born in Australia, Anderson received his BA in 1993 and his MA in 1997 both from the University of Melbourne, and his MBA in 2004 from the London Business School. In 2013 he was awarded an honorary doctorate by RISEBA Business School.

Anderson started his academic career at the London Business School from 1999 until 2004. From 2004 he stayed affiliated with the London Business School as visiting professor, and from 2004 to 2009 he was Senior Lecturer at the European School of Management and Technology (ESMT). Since 2010 he is adjunct professor at the Antwerp Management School.

His research interests focus on "the interconnectedness between leadership, strategy and change."

== Publications ==
Anderson authored and co-authored several articles in the Strategy, Culture, Telecommunications and Technology. Books, a selection:

- Anderson, Jamie, Jörg Reckhenrich, and Martin Kupp. The fine art of success: how learning great art can create great business. John Wiley & Sons, 2011.

Articles, a selection:

- Anderson, J., & Markides, C. (2007). "Strategic Innovation at the Base of the Economic Pyramid." MIT Sloan. Management Review, 49(1),
- Reckhenrich, Jörg, Martin Kupp, and Jamie Anderson. "Understanding creativity: The manager as artist." Business Strategy Review 20.2 (2009): 68–73.
- Anderson, Jamie, Martin Kupp, and Jörg Reckhenrich. "Art lessons for the global manager." Business Strategy Review 20.1 (2009): 50–57.
- Reckhenrich, Jörg, Jamie Anderson, and Martin Kupp. "The shark is dead: how to build yourself a new market." Business Strategy Review 20.4 (2009): 40–47.

Jamie is also a prolific case writer. He found his place among the top 40 case authors consistently, since the list was first published in 2016 by The Case Centre. He ranked 36th In 2018/19, 34th in 2017/18, 38th in 2016/17 and 21st in 2015/16.

== Quotes ==
- "The hallmark of the internet is the free exchange of information. However, individuals must know what information they're revealing when they visit websites, and corporations must restrict and safeguard the personal information they gather.”
  - Jamie Anderson, cited in Stephanie J. Coopman, James Lull (2011) Public Speaking: The Evolving Art, Enhanced, 2nd ed.. p. 116
