= Lou Van Beirendonck =

Belgian psychologist and consultant

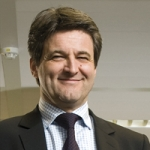
Lou Van Beirendonck

Lodewijk Constant (Lou) Van Beirendonck (born 1960) is a Belgian organizational psychologist, management consultant, and Associate Professor of Human resource management at the Antwerp Management School, known for his work on competence management.

== Biography ==
Van Beirendonck received his Master in Psychology in 1984 from the Katholieke Universiteit Leuven, his MBA in 1992 from the University of Antwerp, and his PhD in Organizational psychology in 2010 from the Tilburg University.

Van Beirendonck started his academic career in 1990 as Executive Professor HRM at the Antwerp Management School, and was Executive Professor at the EHSAL Management School at the Hogeschool-Universiteit Brussel from 1990 to 2010. Since 2000 he has also been a visiting professor at the Vlerick Leuven Gent Management School. Since 2010 he has been an associate professor of human resource management at the Antwerp Management School, and academic director of the master class ‘HR Management’.

Van Beirendonck has also been executive at the Catholic University of Mechlin from 2004 to 2010, and had started his own consultancy firm in 1988.

== Selected publications ==
Books, a selection:

- 1992. Dieptezicht in competentiemanagement. Integratie van een modernistische en postmodernistische visie. MBA thesis University of Antwerp
- 2001. Competentiemanagement: the essence is human competence. Acco, 2001.
- 2004. Management des compétences: évaluation, développement et gestion. De Boeck Supérieur.
- 2010. Handboek HRM: competentiemanagement en arbeidsrecht. With Erik Henderickx, Ria Janvier, & Jeroen Lorré (2010). Leuven.
