= TIAS School for Business and Society =

Dutch business school

- Motto: Never stop asking
- Type: Business School
- Established: 1986
- Location: Tilburg; Utrecht
- Campus: Tilburg Utrecht
- Website: www.tias.edu

TIAS School for Business and Society is a business school which is affiliated with Tilburg University and Eindhoven University of Technology. TIAS focuses on post-experience management education. The business school has campuses in Tilburg and Utrecht.

== History ==
The history of TIAS goes back to 1982 and covers over three decades

- 1982 - Professor Harry Peeters founds the “Tilburgs Instituut voor Academische Studies”.
- 1986 - Tias changes its acronym to denote Tilburg Institute for Advanced Studies and makes management education its core business.
- 1986 - The first two master programs were created: ‘Banking and Finance’ and 'Managerial Information Science’ (which still exist today as ‘Master in Finance’ and ‘Master in Information Management’ respectively).
- 1986 - 1995 - On average one new Master program is launched every year.
- 1996 - Tias focuses on post-experience management education only, and adds contract research and company specific programs and executive education are added to the portfolio of activities.
- 1999 - Tias starts a dual-degree Executive MBA with Purdue University in the United States, Central European University in Budapest, Hungary, and GISMA in Hanover, Germany.
- 2001 - Tias becomes a private company, with Tilburg University as its sole shareholder.
- 2004 - Eindhoven University of Technology acquires 20% of Tias shares.
- 2004 - Tias integrates the management education activities of Eindhoven University of Technology.
- 2006 - Tias merges with Universiteit Nimbas in Utrecht by acquiring 100% of its shares and becoming TiasNimbas.
- 2006 - TiasNimbas Fellowship Program expands faculty base to 11.
- 2009 - Prof. dr. ir. Ramon O’Callaghan takes over from Philippe Naert as Dean of TiasNimbas Business School.
- 2009 - Formal cooperation between TiasNimbas and the School of Economics and Management of Tilburg University to jointly design a new full-time MBA and a suite of Executive Programs.
- 2010 - TiasNimbas ranks in all categories of the Financial Times Ranking for the first time.
- 2010 - Launch new full-time MBA
- 2012 - Prof.dr. Kees Koedijk takes over from Ramon O’Callaghan as Dean of TiasNimbas Business School.
- 2014 - TIAS School for Business and Society is the new name of TiasNimbas Business School

== TIAS organization ==
=== Programs ===
The business school offers MBA, Executive PhD, Masters (MSc), Executive Masters and shorter executive programs, in a number of locations and in various formats. In addition, TIAS designs and delivers tailor-made company specific programs for national and international organizations.

=== Rankings ===
Executive education: TIAS is the only Dutch business school in the Financial Times Top 50 Executive Education. Worldwide TiasNimbas is ranked #46.

Company Specific Programs: #1 in the Netherlands, #21 in Europe and #47 worldwide

Open programs: #2 in the Netherlands, #25 in Europe and #57worldwide

Full-Time MBA: Financial Times ranks TIAS #64 worldwide, #18 in Europe and #2 in the Benelux. The MBA scores especially on the criteria value-for-money (#10) and international mobility (#7).

=== Accreditations ===
TIAS has accreditations of Association of MBAs (AMBA) and Association to Advance Collegiate Schools of Business (AACSB). These are both accreditations of the triple crown. In addition, TIAS programmes are accredited by the Nederlands-Vlaamse Accreditatieorganisatie (NVAO).
