= Van Thielen =

van Thielen or Vanthielen is a surname. Notable people with the surname include:

- Francesca Vanthielen (born 1972), Belgian actress, television presenter and economist
- Jan Philip van Thielen (1618–1667), Flemish Baroque painter
- Maria Theresa van Thielen (1640–1706), Flemish Baroque painter, daughter of Jan
