= Van Leeuwen Pipe and Tube Group =

Royal Van Leeuwen Pipe and Tube Group
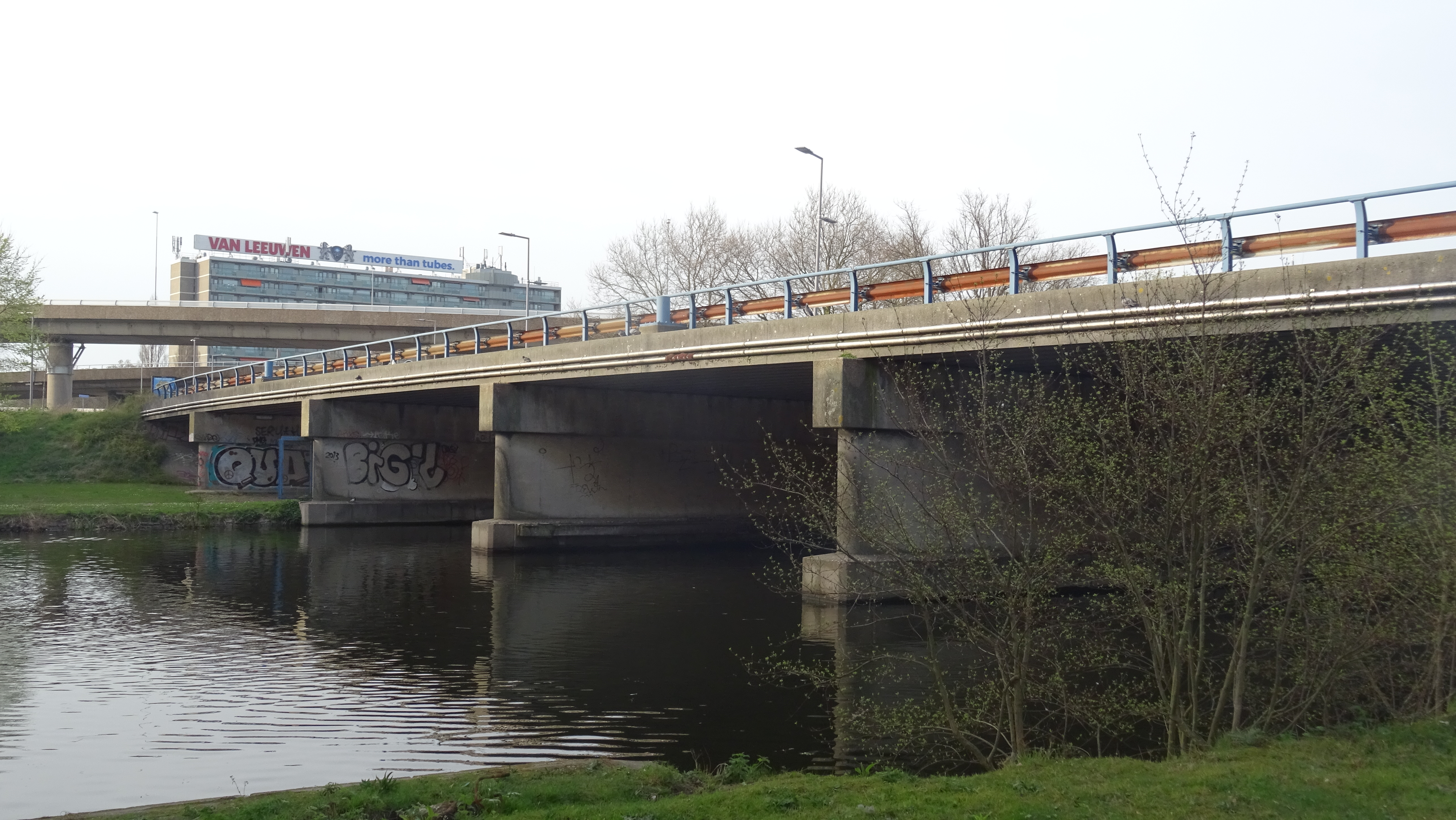
- Founded: 1924
- Headquarters: Zwijndrecht (South Holland), The Netherlands
- Products: pipes/tubes/pipecomponents/valves
- Revenue: € 1.23 billion (2025)
- Number of employees: 2,178
- Website: www.vanleeuwen.com

The Royal Van Leeuwen Pipe and Tube Group is a Dutch international industrial distributor of steel pipes, valves and fittings.

== History ==
The Royal Van Leeuwen Pipe and Tube Group was established by Piet van Leeuwen Jr. in Zwijndrecht, the Netherlands, in 1924. Soon after the end of World War II the company became active internationally. The company opened a subsidiary in Brussels in Belgium in 1947. Soon more subsidiaries were opened in France, Great Britain and Germany between the 1950s and 1970s. In the years to follow the company took its first global footsteps. Starting in 1975 with North America rapidly followed by South East Asia with the opening of a stockkeeping facility and salesoffice in Singapore in 1979. In 1983 the first location in Australia started. After the year 2000 the company extended its global presence more. Especially by the start of offices, stocklocations and joint ventures in China, the Middle East and Central Europe.

In December 2019 Van Leeuwen completed the acquisition of Benteler Distribution, a division of Benteler International AG.

The company celebrated its 100-year anniversary in 2024. In recognition of this milestone, his Majesty King Willem-Alexander, King of the Netherlands, has granted the company the designation ‘Royal’.
