= Language/action perspective =

The language/action perspective "takes language as the primary dimension of human cooperative activity," applied not just in person-to-person direct (face-to-face) interactions, but also in the design of systems mediated by information and communication technology. The perspective was developed in the joint authorship of Understanding Computers and Cognition by Fernando Flores and Terry Winograd in 1987.

== Overview ==
As part of a reflection published in 2006, Terry Winograd describes the language-action perspective as resting on two key orienting principles:

The first is its focus on linguistic communication as the basis for understanding what occurs in information systems. Ultimately all information is communication: not an abstract system of bits and bytes but a means by which people interact.
The second principle is that language is action. Through their linguistic acts people effect change in the world. In imposing a language-action framework on information technology, we emphasize the action dimension over the more traditional dimension of information content.

Language is action argues that speech isn't simply composed of assertions about the situation: utterances may also create a situation, such as, "Let's go to the park." That utterance may be subject to interpretation but is not verifiable via the state of the world. This principle is closely linked to the ideas from phenomenology. Furthermore, language is not the transmission of information, which simply correspond to the state of the world. By creating a situation, language forms a consensual domain to further encourage more action through language. These speech acts may often take the form of commitment to other actions.

In the design of information systems, the perspective is based upon the notion as proposed by Terry Winograd that information technology may be limited in its ability to improve human communication. "Expert behavior requires an exquisite sensitivity to context and an ability to know what to commit to. Computing machines, which are purposely designed to process symbols independent of their context, have no hope of becoming experts.". That sensitivity to context is thus more in the realm of the human than in that of the artificial.

== History ==
Research on LAP was done in the Advanced Technology Group (ATG) at Apple Computer in the late 1980s. Winograd was invited to present the basic concepts in a seminar at Apple in the winter of 1988. Some Apple ATG researchers, notably Tom Pittard and Brad Hartfield, saw potential for enhancing the user experience of network based computer interactions if LAP was included in the mix of basic design considerations.

Research on the application of LAP to business process modelling was done in the System Modelling Research Group, Faculty of Computing, Engineering and Mathematical Sciences, University of the West of England in the early 2000s.

== Applications ==
Insights from related work have been applied over the past two decades. At the LAP 2004 - Conference, Kalle Lyytinen discussed the academic/theoretic success of LAP. Yet, these LAP successes have not found entry into the wider stream of applications. In a sense, LAP is now peripheral to computer science, however there may be a need for a deeper look at this viewpoint.

LAP played a role in the second AI Winter. At the time, symbolic AI tried to represent intelligence using a growing knowledge base represented as facts in language. The LAP argued that language was not simply a correspondence with facts but instead depended upon the contextual domain and could not be rigidly defined. Even Winograd's SHRDLU, an exemplar of language understanding in AI, was incapable of broadening its understanding beyond the blocks world.

== See also ==
- Artificial general intelligence
- Design & Engineering Methodology for Organizations (DEMO)
- End-user computing
- Information science
