= Jan Vanthienen =

Jan Vanthienen (born 1956) is a Belgian information systems scientist and professor of information systems engineering at Leuven University (KU Leuven), known for his contributions to business process modeling, process mining and business engineering.

== Biography ==
Vanthienen received MA in applied economics and computer science at the Leuven University in 1979, and a PhD in applied economics at the Department of Applied Economics, Leuven University, in 1986.

He started working as a researcher at the Leuven University in 1979, where he became an associate professor in 1987, a professor in 1994, and a full professor in 1996. At the moment, in 2009, he is chairholder of the PricewaterhouseCoopers Chair on E-Business at KU Leuven and co-chairholder of the Microsoft Research Chair on Intelligent Environments. He has been a visiting professor at Loyola College in Maryland, Sellinger School of Business and Management, Baltimore, Maryland, in 1991, at the University of Antwerp since 1998 and at the Vlerick Leuven Gent Management School from 2000 to 2003.

Vanthienen has been a member of the editorial board of the journal Informatie from 1995 to 1999, International Journal of Digital Accounting since 2001 and Expert Systems with Applications since 2002.

He is a founding member of the Leuven Institute for Research in Information Systems (LIRIS), and a member of the ACM and the IEEE Computer Society.

As of 2017, Vanthienan served on the editorial advisory board for the peer-reviewed Elsevier journal Decision Support Systems.

== Work ==
His research interests are in the field of information systems: information systems analysis and design, business rules & business processes, business intelligence, knowledge-based systems, intelligent systems, object-oriented development, decision tables, e-learning, information management.

More specific research topics are business rule modeling, rule-based business processes, e-business, business intelligence, artificial intelligence marketing, knowledge based systems, V&V, decision tables, help desk and service automation.

== Publications ==
Vanthienen has published numerous papers, articles and other publications. A selection:

- 2006. "Designing compliant business processes with obligations and permissions. Business process management workshops". With S. Goedertier. In: Lecture Notes in Computer Science. vol. 4103, pp. 5 – 14.
- 2007. "A new approach for discovering business process models from event logs". With S. Goedertier et al. DTEW - KBI_0716, pp. 1 – 20.
- 2007. "EM-BrA2CE v0.1: A vocabulary and execution model for declarative business process modeling". With S. Goedertier and R. Haesen. DTEW - KBI_0728.
- 2008. "Semantic decision tables: self-organizing and reorganizable decision tables". With Y. Tang, and R. Meersman. In: Lecture Notes in Computer Science. pp. 434 – 449.
