= Jan Hoogervorst =

Dutch organizational theorist (born c.1952)

Johannes Adrianus Petrus (Jan) Hoogervorst (born ca 1952) is a Dutch organizational theorist, business executive, management consultant, and Professor Enterprise Governance and Enterprise Engineering at the University of Antwerp, known for his work in the field of enterprise engineering.

== Biography ==
Hoogervorst received his MA in Electrical Engineering at the Delft University of Technology in 1977. Later in 1998 he obtained his PhD in Work and Organizational Psychology at the Vrije Universiteit in Amsterdam with a thesis entitled "Quality and customer oriented behavior : towards a coherent approach for improvement."

After his graduation in Delft he started his 27 years long career at KLM Royal Dutch Airlines as Manager at the Aircraft Systems Group. From 1983 to 1987 he was manager of the Avionics and Accessories Overhaul Department. In 1988 he was promoted to Vice President Aircraft Maintenance. In 1992, he became Vice President Flight Crew Training, and from 1998 to 2004 Vice President Corporate Information Strategy.

Since 2005, he is management consultant at Sogeti, and since 2011 Professor Enterprise Governance and Enterprise Engineering at the University of Antwerp and at the Antwerp Management School. He is also lecturer at the Delft TopTech, School of Executive Education at the Delft University of Technology.

== Work ==
Hoogervorst's research interests are in the field of enterprise engineering and enterprise governance. With his work he is aiming to "provide an overarching multidisciplinary perspective to integrate and unify insights from the traditional organisational sciences into an overall enterprise design perspective."

== Publications ==
Hoogervorst authored and co-authored several publications in the field of enterprise engineering. Books, a selection:

- 1998. Quality and customer oriented behavior : towards a coherent approach for improvement : organizational culture, management practices, structures and systems, description and measurement of relationships. Delft : Eburon.
- 2007. Enterprise governance & architectuur : corporate, IT en enterprise governance in samenhangend perspectief. Den Haag : Academic Service

Articles, a selection:

- Hoogervorst, Jan AP, Paul L. Koopman, and Henk van der Flier. "Human resource strategy for the new ICT-driven business context." International Journal of Human Resource Management 13.8 (2002): 1245-1265.
- Hoogervorst, J. A. N. "Enterprise architecture: Enabling integration, agility and change." International Journal of Cooperative Information Systems 13.03 (2004): 213-233.
- Hoogervorst, Jan, Henk van der Flier, and Paul Koopman. "Implicit communication in organisations: The impact of culture, structure and management practices on employee behaviour." Journal of Managerial Psychology 19.3 (2004): 288-311.
