= Enterprise control =

Enterprise control is the ability to combine control, intelligence and process management to enable business optimization that is inclusive of business and production operations. It combines the strength of both business processes and production operations processes. It is the deliberate act of synchronizing business strategy with operational execution in real-time to enable closed loop business control across an enterprise.

== Overview ==
A distributed control system gave way to process automation systems which lead the way for the concept of collaborative automation process systems developed by ARC Advisory Group Later, enterprise control systems became key terminology in the marketplace.

ANSI/ISA-95 Enterprise-Control System Integration, or ISA-95 (known internationally as IEC 62264) is an international standard for developing an automated interface between enterprise and control systems. This standard has been developed for global manufacturers. There are five levels and It was developed to be applied in all industries, and in all sorts of processes, like batch processes, continuous and repetitive processes.

== Key elements ==
- Enterprise resource planning (ERP)
- Environment and safety systems
- Supply chain
- Assets
- People

Interoperating enterprise and industrial service-oriented architectures (SOA) provide industrial companies with the potential for problem solutions that cover entire plants and entire industrial enterprises. This enterprise-wide system can be developed using systems and technologies previously installed. The resulting system, consisting of multiple vendor products acquired over many years working as a single system, is what is referred to as an enterprise control system.

The enterprise control strategy is built around the premise that manufacturing needs an enterprise control system to integrate business systems and manufacturing in real-time. The concept of the enterprise control system encompasses everything from sensors and people in manufacturing to the ERP system.

An enterprise control system is the open architecture framework to integrate control systems with the enterprise while adding functions to improve business performance including MES, optimization, workflow, quality management, and asset management.

== ISA95 “levels” ==
Purdue Reference Model, “95” provides a model that end users, integrators and vendors can share in integrating applications at key layers in the enterprise. This model influenced the ISA-95 (International Society of Automation) enterprise-control integration standards, which expanded on the terms of the Purdue Reference Model and describes the interface between enterprise and control systems.

- Level 0 — The physical process — Defines the physical environment. Represent the physical production process and where the collection of data begins.
- Level 1 — Intelligent devices — Sensing and manipulating the physical processes. Process *sensors, analyzers, actuators and related instrumentation.
- Level 2 — Control systems — Supervising, monitoring and controlling the physical processes. Real-time controls and software; DCS, human-machine interface (HMI); supervisory and data acquisition (SCADA) software.
- Level 3 — Manufacturing operations systems — Managing production work flow to produce the desired products. Batch management; manufacturing execution/operations management systems (MES / MOMS); laboratory, maintenance and plant performance management systems; data historians and related middleware. Time frame: shifts, hours, minutes, seconds.
- Level 4 — Business logistics systems — Managing the business-related activities of the manufacturing operation. ERP is the primary system; establishes the basic plant production schedule, material use, shipping and inventory levels. Time frame: months, weeks, days, shifts.
- Level 5 — Business-to-Manufacturing Transactions — Transactions are defined in terms of the information exchanged between applications performing business and manufacturing activities associated with Levels 3 and 4. These exchanges are meant to enable the collection, retrieval, transfer and storage of information in support of enterprise-control system integration.

== See also ==
- Control system
- Manufacturing execution system
