= Purdue Enterprise Reference Architecture =

Reference model for enterprise architecture

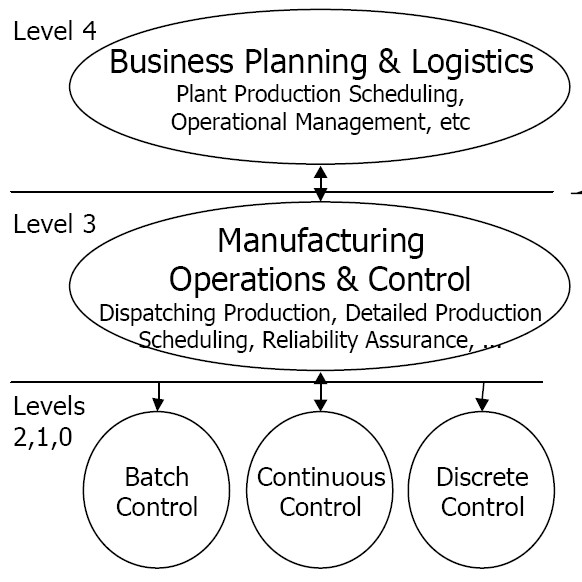
PERA Reference model: Decision-making and control hierarchy, 1992

Purdue Enterprise Reference Architecture (PERA), or the Purdue model, is a 1990s reference model for enterprise architecture, developed by Theodore J. Williams and members of the Industry-Purdue University Consortium for Computer Integrated Manufacturing.

== Overview ==
PERA is a reference architecture that can model the enterprise in multiple layers and in multiple stages of the architectural life cycle. Initially PERA was part of the PERA methodology, which consisted of three main building blocks:

- Purdue Enterprise Reference Architecture,
- Purdue Reference Model, and
- Purdue implementation procedures manual

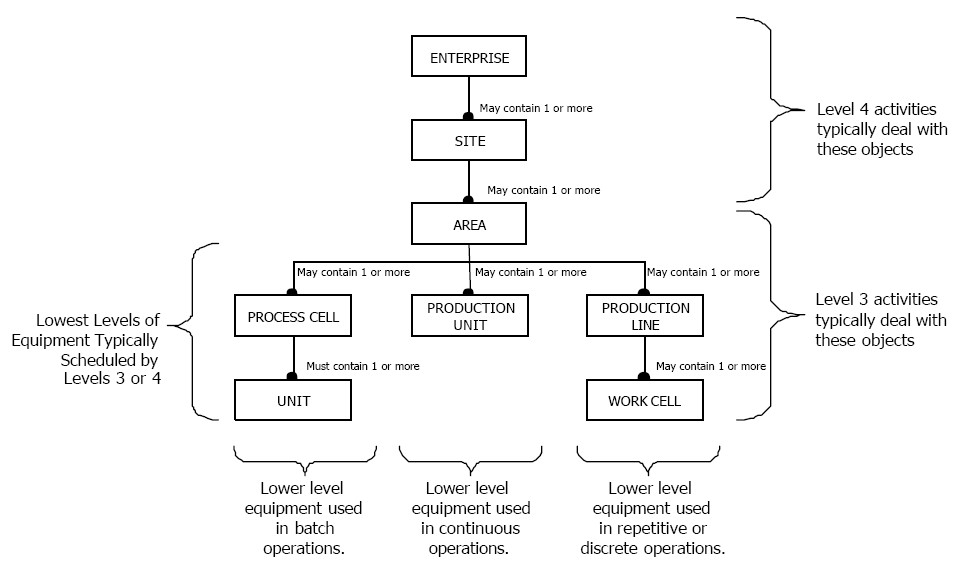
PERA Equipment organization.

PERA has been further developed, and according to Gary Rathwell, PERA nowadays consists of the following components:

- The PERA Enterprise Life-cycle Framework or Model or Architecture...
- Concepts of maximum and minimum lines of automation...
- Concepts explaining the effect of recycle and time delays on the design and operation of facilities.
- The PERA Master Planning Methodology
- Concepts for dividing Enterprise Systems into Physical and Logical Architectures.
- Purdue Reference Model for CIM including Generic Reference Data Flow Models.
- Example Logical System Architectures from various industries...
- Physical Systems Architecture Concepts including "Levels" and the "4Rs".
- Example Physical architectures from various industries ...
- Mapping of hardware and software products within the PERA Framework

Later in the 1990s combined insights from PERA, and other reference architectures such as GRAI Integrated Methodology, CIM-OSA, and TOVE has led to the development of the Generic Enterprise Reference Architecture and Methodology

== Levels for enterprise integration ==
Purdue Reference Model, “95” provides a model for enterprise control, which end users, integrators and vendors can share in integrating applications at key layers in the enterprise:

- Level 0 — The physical process — Defines the actual physical processes.
- Level 1 — Intelligent devices — Sensing and manipulating the physical processes. Process sensors, analyzers, actuators and related instrumentation.
- Level 2 — Control systems — Supervising, monitoring and controlling the physical processes. Real-time controls and software; DCS, human-machine interface (HMI); supervisory control and data acquisition (SCADA) software.
- Level 3 — Manufacturing operations systems — Managing production work flow to produce the desired products. Batch management; manufacturing execution/operations management systems (MES/MOMS); laboratory, maintenance and plant performance management systems; data historians and related middleware. Time frame: shifts, hours, minutes, seconds.
- Level 4 — Business logistics systems — Managing the business-related activities of the manufacturing operation. ERP is the primary system; establishes the basic plant production schedule, material use, shipping and inventory levels. Time frame: months, weeks, days, shifts.

== See also ==
- ANSI/ISA-95
- Enterprise integration
- Manufacturing execution system
- TOVE Project

== Publications ==
- Peter Bernus and Laszlo Nemes (1996) "A framework to define a generic enterprise reference architecture and methodology." Computer Integrated Manufacturing Systems Vol 9 (3). p. 179-191.
- David Chen, Bruno Vallespir, and Guy Doumeingts (1997). "GRAI integrated methodology and its mapping onto generic enterprise reference architecture and methodology." Computers in industry Vol 33 (2). p. 387-394.
- Theodore J. Williams (1992) The Purdue enterprise reference architecture: a technical guide for CIM planning and implementation. Research Triangle Park, NC: Instrument Society of America.
- Theodore J. Williams (1993) "The Purdue enterprise reference architecture." Proceedings of the JSPE/IFIP TC5/WG5. 3 Workshop on the Design of Information Infrastructure Systems for Manufacturing. North-Holland Publishing Co.
- Theodore J. Williams (1994) "The Purdue enterprise reference architecture." Computers in industry Vol 24 (2). p. 141-158.
