= OpenO&M =

OpenO&M (Open Operations and Maintenance) is an initiative of the following industry standards organisations:

- The International Society of Automation (ISA)
- Machinery Information Management Open System Alliance (MIMOSA)
- Manufacturing Enterprise Solutions Association (MESA) International
- OPC Foundation
- Open Applications Group (OAGi)

The aim of OpenO&M is to provide a harmonized set of standards. From the organizational point of view, OpenO&M is a virtual organization maintained by MIMOSA.

== OpenO&M framework ==
The OpenO&M framework consists of the following standards for the exchange of Operations & Maintenance data and associated context:

- MIMOSA Open System Architecture for Enterprise Application Integration (OSA-EAI)
- MIMOSA Open System Architecture for Condition-Based Maintenance (OSA-CBM) based on ISO 13374
- ANSI/ISA-95 – Enterprise/Control System Interface Standard
- ISA-99 – Control System Cyber-Security Standard
- ISA-OMAC – Open Modular Architecture Controls group standardizing packaging machinery interfaces
- OPC interface specifications and data transport standards

== Joint working groups ==
OpenO&M is composed Joint Working Groups (JWG). These JWG are diverse groups of relevant organizations and subject matter experts. There are three Joint Working Groups:

- Manufacturing JWG
- Facilities JWG
- Military JWG

The JWG are focused on enabling O&M application interoperability. The goal of the JWG is to offer domain end users a harmonized set of data exchange standards while avoiding duplication of work.
