= PackML =

Packaging machine industry standard

PackML (Packaging Machine Language) is an industry technical standard for the control of packaging machines, as an aspect of industrial automation.

PackML was created by the Organization for Machine Automation and Control (OMAC) in conjunction with the International Society of Automation (ISA). The primary objective of PackML is to bring a common “look and feel” and operational consistency to all machines that make up a packing line (note: can be used for other types of discrete process) PackML provides:

== Description ==
The Manufacturing Automation Industry is broken down into three main categories; continuous control, batch control and discrete control. The batch control industry and the packaging industry (discrete control of packaging machines) are the focus of a set of standards and guidelines that are similar but have differences driven by equipment functionality.

- Standard defined machine states and operational flow
- Overall equipment effectiveness (OEE) data
- Root-cause analysis (RCA) data
- Flexible recipe schemes and common SCADA or MES inputs

These provisions are enabled by the “Line Types” definitions (“Guidelines for Packaging Machinery Automation v3.1") created by the OMAC Packaging Workgroup, and leveraging the ISA-88 State Model concepts. PackML definitions are intended to make machines more serviceable and easier to redeploy. PackML concepts are also finding application in the other discrete control environments such as converting, assembled products, machine tools, and robotics.

In an effort to gain industry acceptance Procter & Gamble (P&G) developed a “PackML Implementation Guide” with a software template & help files that was provided royalty-free, non-exclusive licensed to OMAC. The guide is an implementation of ANSI/ISA-TR88.00.02-2015, borrows concepts from ANSI/ISA-88 Part 1 and embraces the ANSI/ISA-88 Part 5 draft concepts of the hierarchical model (Machine/Unit, Station/Equipment Module, Control Device/Control Module). The OMAC Implementation Guide provides PackML implementation guidelines, data structures and a minimum set of recommended PackTags (i.e. those typically needed for commercial MES packages). The implementation guideline provides a method to deliver State Control, Machine-to-Machine Communications and Machine-to-Information System Communications.

The PackML Implementation Guide is software (ladder-based) and is oriented towards Rockwell control systems. It is structured such that PackML “States” can directly drive “ANSI/ISA88 Part 5 Equipment & Control Modules”. Many control suppliers (including Siemens, Lenze, Bosch, Rockwell, Mitsubishi, B&R, ELAU, Beckhoff ) have developed their own PackML software template. As control suppliers provide their implementations, links are posted on the OMAC web site.

== Standards ==
- ANSI/ISA-88 Batch Control
  - Part 1 – Batch Control Models and Terminology (IEC 61512-1)
  - Part 2 – Data Structures and Guidelines for Languages (IEC 61512-2)
  - Part 3 – General and Site Recipe Models and Representations (IEC 61512-3)
  - Part 4 – Batch Production Records (IEC 61512-4)
  - Part 5 – (Make2Pack) Equipment Modules and Control Modules
  - ANSI/ISA-TR88.00.02-2015 Machine and Unit States: An implementation example of ANSI/ISA-88.00.01 ISBN 978-1-941546-65-9
- ANSI/ISA-95 Integration of Enterprise and Control Systems
  - Part 1 – Models and Terminologies (IEC 62264-1)
  - Part 2 – Object Model Attributes (IEC 62264-2)
  - Part 3 – Activity Models of Manufacturing Operations Management (IEC 62264-3)
  - Part 4 – Object Models & Attributes for Manufacturing Operations Management
  - Part 5 – Business to Manufacturing Transactions
- IEC - International Electrotechnical Commission
  - IEC 60848: 2002, GRAFCET specification language for sequential function charts
  - IEC 60050-351: 2006, International Electrotechnical Vocabulary – Part 351: Control technology
  - ANSI/ISA-95.00.01-2010 (IEC 62264-1 Mod), Enterprise-Control System Integration – Part 1: Models and Terminology
  - ANSI/ISA-95.00.02-2010 (IEC 62264-2 Mod), Enterprise-Control System Integration – Part 2: Object Model Attributes
  - ANSI/ISA–95.00.03 Enterprise-Control System Integration Part 3: Activity models of manufacturing operations management
  - IEC/ISO 62264-1, Enterprise-Control System Integration - Part 1: Models and Terminology

== History ==
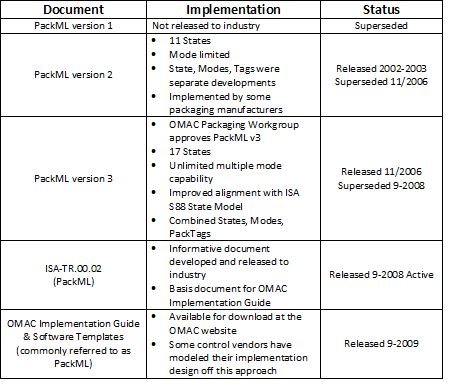
Table 1: Key Events in Development

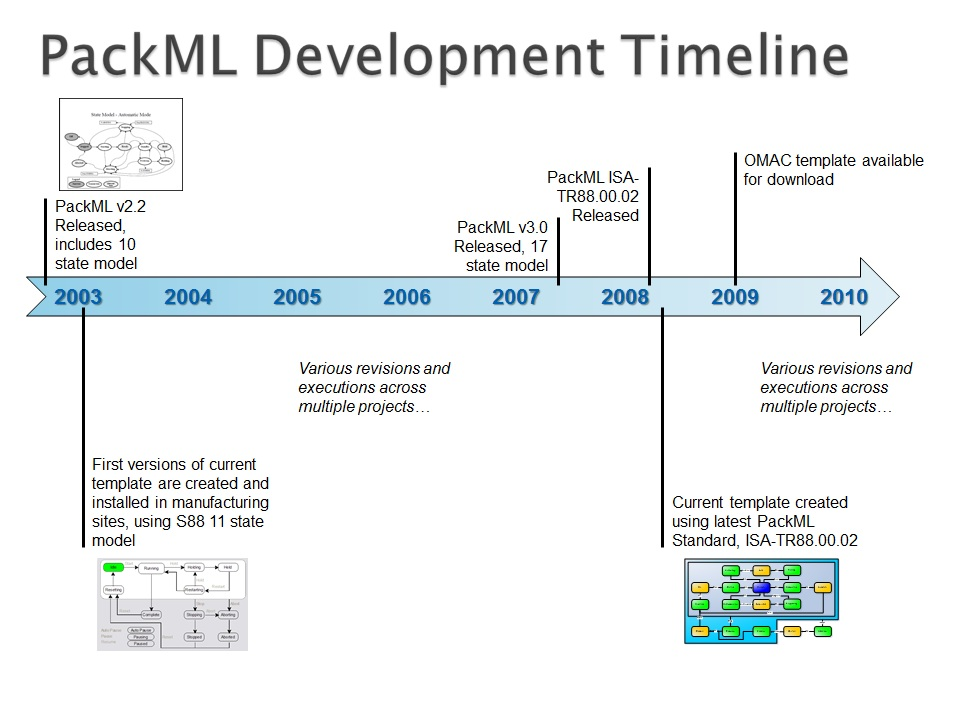

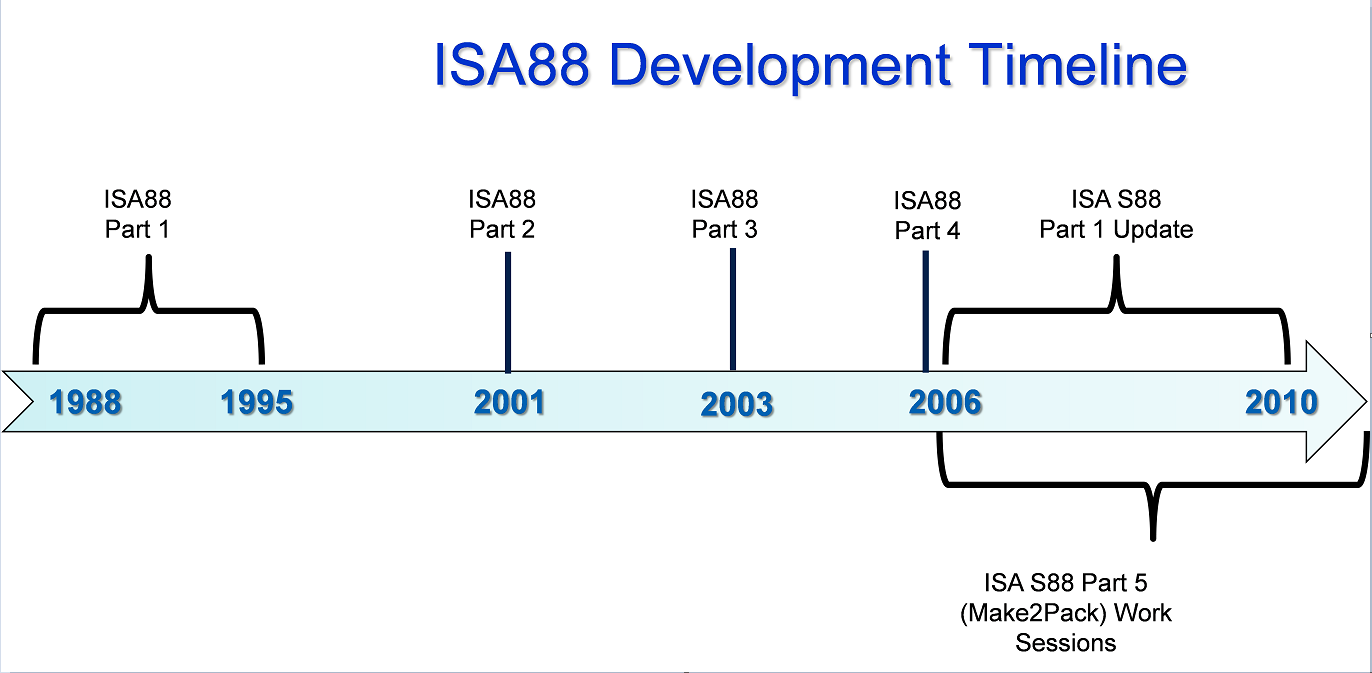

The ISA-88 Committee started work in the 1980s and has developed a series of standards and technical reports with the intent of providing a broadly accepted set of concepts, models and definitions for the batch control industry. ISA 88 Part 1, Batch Control Models and Terminology, introduces the concepts of a hierarchical model, a state model and modular software design.

In the late 1980s the ISA began an effort to develop a set of standards for the Batch Control Industry with the intent of providing improved system performance and programming efficiencies by way of a standard set of models and procedures. ANSI/ISA-88 Part 5 (Make2Pack) was written to provide a standard specifically for Equipment Modules and Control Modules. Starting in the early 2000s OMAC began work on a similar standard that embraced some of the basic concepts developed for the Batch Control Industry with the intent of providing the same benefits to the Machine Control Industry, specifically for Packaging Machines. These standards continued in parallel development until 2008 when an ISA sanctioned technical report was written to harmonize these standards. ANSI/ISA TR88.00.02-2008 Machine and Unit States: An Implementation Example of ISA-88 became the basis of the Packaging Standard PackML.

In the early 2000s the OMAC Packaging Work Group formed 3 technical sub-committees to help unify the way machines are introduced into the packaging market. Each committee had a specific focus area:

- PackSoft: Research applicable programming languages to the packaging industry
- PackConnect: Research applicable field bus networks to the packaging industry
- PackML: Bridge the gap between PackSoft and PackConnect

The PackML sub-committee's focus was to develop a method to quickly integrate a line of machines without concern on what field bus (protocol & media-the domain of the PackConnect sub-committee) was going to carry the data set between machines, SCADA and MES. After several iterations the approach taken was to extend the ANSI/ISA-88 Part 1 State Model concept to the Packaging Industry. Later in the development process, the concept of PackTags was introduced to provide a uniform set of naming conventions for data elements used within the state model. PackTags are used for machine-to-machine communications; for example between a Filler and a Capper. In addition, PackTags were designed to address OEE (Overall Equipment Effectiveness) calculations. PackTags can be used to provide data exchange between machines and higher level information systems like Manufacturing Operations Management and Enterprise Information Systems.

In 2004 the WBF (WBF - The Organization for Production Technology) formed the Make2Pack workgroup, which was chartered to evaluate the similarities between OMAC's PackML and WBF's automation efforts. Based upon the workgroups determination the WBF expanded the Make2Pack Effort in 2006 to develop a new Batch Control Standard titled “Batch Control – Part 5: Implementation Models & Terminology for Modular Equipment Control” with the intent of providing a guideline for modular control for all automation industries. This effort was then chartered by ISA under “ISA-TR88.00.05-Machine and Unit States” but was later designated as TR88.00.02. ISA-TR88.00.02 was approved in 2008 and is the basis document for the OMAC PackML Implementation Guide.

OMAC later became affiliated with ISA in 2005. OMAC is an independent, self-funded organization. It gets additional non-monetary support from PMMI (Packaging Machinery Manufacturers Institute) and ARC (Automation Research Corporation).

The PackML and PackTags guideline documents have gone through several versions (v1, v2, v3). During the PackML development process, PackTags were combined into the guideline documents. In 2008 the final version (v3), which contains both PackML and PackTags, were updated and harmonized with the ANSI/ISA-88.00.01 standard terms and definitions to produce the technical report ANSI/ISA-TR88.00.02-2008 Machine and Unit States: An Implementation Example of ISA-88. ANSI/ISA-TR88.00.02 defines ISA-S88 Part 1 and Part 5 concepts of Modes, States and data structures (PackTags) in a Package Machine environment and provides example implementations.

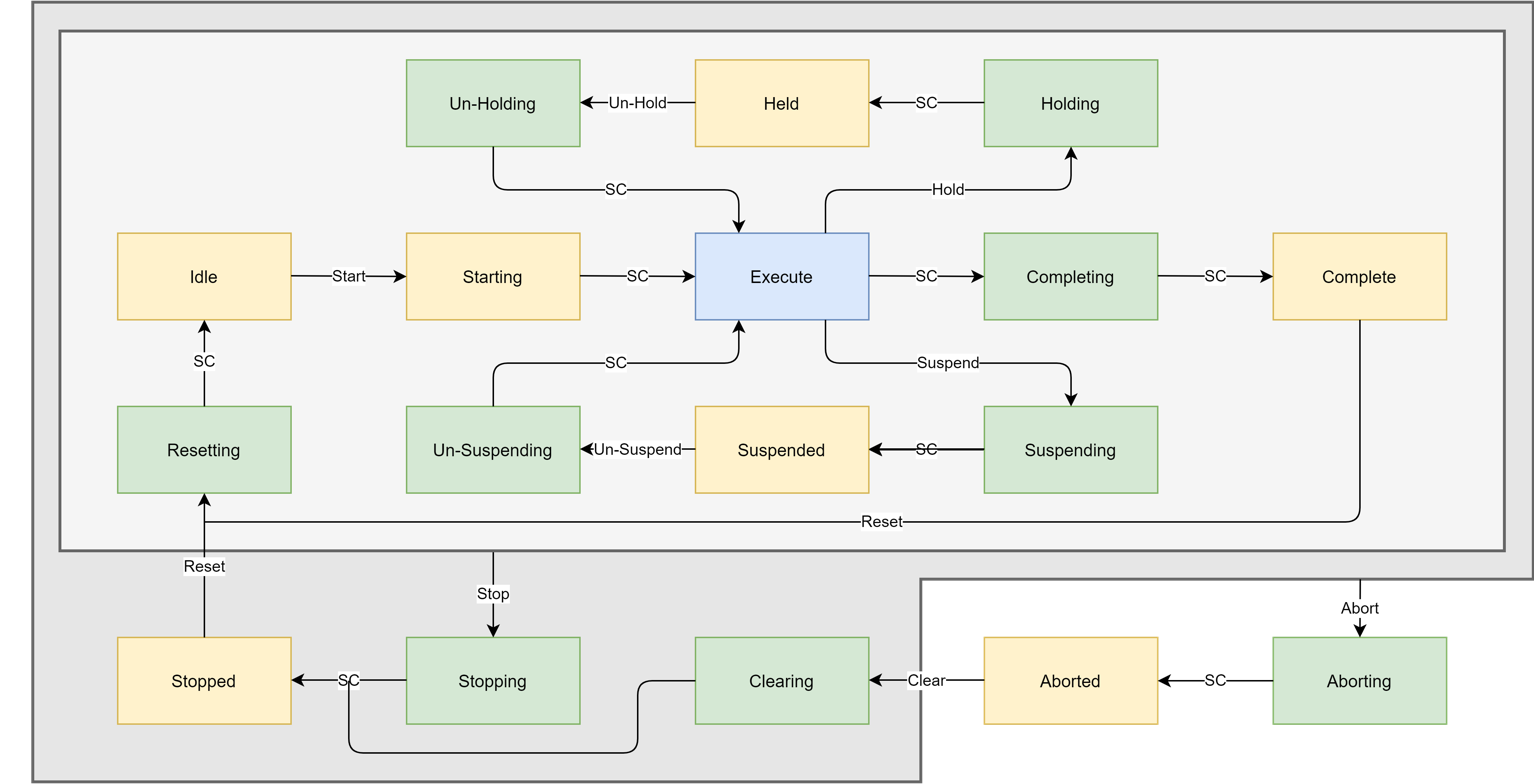
PackML State Model

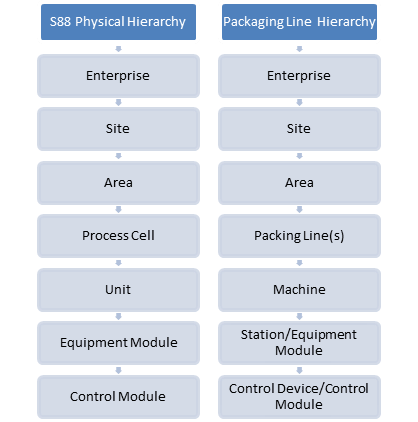
Comparison of Physical Hierarchies

PackML has previously released versions 1, 2 & 3, with several implementations of version 2 in existence. The PackML version 2 implementation had the disadvantage of being memory intensive for PLC processors, unnecessary unused code as well as having an incomplete state/mode model for some machines. PackML v3 corrected these disadvantages. It was superseded when it was harmonized with the S88 Part 5 efforts to become ISA-TR88.00.02.
