= Asset health management =

Field of study to manage the health of assets

In asset management, asset health management (AHM) is the field of study that looks at how to manage the "health" of an assets in a facility, system, or fleet. This often includes methods to establish asset health and effort to decide the appropriate actions to be taken to manage the assets' health. This also includes the discussion of health at end of life to ensure the asset's full life is used efficiently.

AHM is used in an increasing number of industries, including electric power generation.

== See also ==
- Fleet management
- Reliability engineering
- Systems engineering

=== Relevant standards ===
- MSG-3
- Open O&M
