= Grüninger =

Grüninger or Gruninger may refer to:

- Johann Grüninger, German printer
- Michael Gruninger, Canadian computer scientist
- Paul Grüninger, Swiss savior of Jewish refugees
