= PDES =

PDES may refer to:

- ISO 10303 - an international standard resulting from the Product Data Exchange Specification effort
- Partial differential equations
- Party for Economic Development and Solidarity
- Process Development Execution System -- systems supporting the execution of high-tech manufacturing process developments
