= Organization for Machine Automation and Control =

- Abbreviation: OMAC
- Formation: 1994
- Chair: Sid Venkatesh
- Parent organization: Automation Federation
- Website: omac.org
- Formerly called: Open Modular Architecture Controls

The Organization for Machine Automation and Control (OMAC) is a global organization that supports the machine automation and operational needs of manufacturing. OMAC, has in conjunction with ISA, created the PackML industry standard for describing the state and transitions of packaging machines. OMAC was formed by General Motors in the 1980s under the name Open Modular Architecture Controls to address the problem of each machine having different controls and/or software implementations. In the late 1990s OMAC expanded into the packaging automation industry.
