= IEC 62264 =

International enterprise-control system

IEC 62264 is an international standard for enterprise control system integration. This standard is based upon ANSI/ISA-95.

== Current parts of IEC 62264 ==
IEC 62264 consists of the following parts detailed in separate IEC 62264 standard documents:

- Part 1:2013 Object Models and Attributes of Manufacturing Operations (Second edition 2013-05)
- Part 2:2013 Object model attributes (Second edition 2013-06)
- Part 3:2016 Activity models of manufacturing operations management (Second edition 2016-12)
- Part 4:2015 Objects models attributes for manufacturing operations management integration
- Part 5:2016 Business to manufacturing transactions
- Publicly Available Specification - Pre-standard Part 6:2016 Messaging Service Model
