= Product data record =

A product record (or product data record) is the data associated with the entire lifecycle of a product from its conception, through design and manufacture, to service and disposal. It includes all the information used to develop, describe, manage and communicate information about products and critical linkage between relevant data elements. It is a key concept of product lifecycle management (PLM) and product data management (PDM), because it represents all the data that PLM processes and software manage and allow access to.

The product record is the single version of the truth for product data and implementing PLM is not possible without first designing the product record. However, PLM solutions often do not physically host all the product record data in their database but only create the logical connections so information can be accessed in its native application.
