= Manufacturing Enterprise Solutions Association =

Manufacturing Enterprise Solutions Association International (MESA, also known as MESA International) is a worldwide not-for-profit community of manufacturing companies, information technology hardware and software suppliers, system integrators, consulting service providers, analysts, editors, academics, and students. MESA's goal is to help member companies improve business results and production operations through application and implementation of information technology and best management practices.

== History ==
MESA was initially founded, in 1992, to promote manufacturing execution systems. Its acronym and reach were later broadened to Manufacturing Enterprise Solutions Association, to include a wider scope of functions in the entire manufacturing enterprise value chain, and the integration of plant floor devices and control systems into enterprise systems and business intelligence for higher levels of automation, visibility, optimization and orchestration of manufacturing processes.

In 2012, MESA merged with WBF (World Batch Forum), the standards organization responsible for B2MML and BatchML.

In 2012, MESA also signed on with the Open O&M group, an initiative of multiple industry standards organizations to provide a harmonized set of standards for the exchange of operations & maintenance (O&M) data and associated context. OpenO&M is an open, collaborative, effort composed of diverse groups of relevant organizations and subject matter experts. The members of OpenO&M initiative are ISA, MESA, MIMOSA, OAGi, and the OPC Foundation.

In 2014, MESA International signed a Memorandum of Understanding with Open Applications Group, Inc. (OAGi), making it easier for both organizations to work together and bring value to their common set of stakeholders, and formalizing the ways in which each organization can contribute to the other's committees and working groups to bring specific expertise to key initiatives.

In 2016, MESA released the first formal definition of Smart Manufacturing in its paper "Smart Manufacturing – The Landscape Explained", which explains the relations and scope of initiatives including the Industrial Internet of Things, and Industrie 4.0.

In 2017, MESA signed an MOU with the Industrial Internet Consortium (IIC). Under the agreement, the two organizations will work together to align efforts to maximize interoperability, portability, security and privacy for the industrial Internet. Joint activities will include identifying and sharing Industrial Internet of Things (IIoT) best practices, realizing interoperability by harmonizing architecture and other elements, collaborating on standardization, and collaboration in the areas of industrial analytics and asset performance management.

Also in 2017, in an effort to promote greater understanding of smart manufacturing (SM) technologies, MESA International and the Clean Energy Smart Manufacturing Innovation Institute (CESMII) announced an agreement that will provide CESMII-member access to valuable education that MESA has developed.

== Activities ==
MESA members participate in and contribute to a number of activities:

- Webcasts
- Creation of relevant content for manufacturing/enterprise integration topics (example: MESA model for manufacturing) – also link papers for MESA. Content is peer-reviewed and noncommercial.
- Creation/publication of B2MML/BATCHML implementations of ISA-95/88
- Forum for collaboration between vendors, manufacturers, and standards organizations
- Peer to peer networking (conferences, working groups)
- Conferences (around the world – North America, Europe, etc.)
- Working groups, such as:
  - Asset Performance Mgt
  - Metrics
  - Smart Manufacturing
  - Food Safety & Traceability

== Participants ==
MESA includes member organizations such as:

- Manufacturers and producers
- Standards organizations
- Vendors (manufacturing solutions providers, enterprise application providers)
- Operations technology and IT functions within organizations
- Academia

People participating in MESA are typically in roles such as:

- Analyst
- Professors and students
- Manufacturing consultant
- Manufacturing executive
- System integrator
- Software architect
- Manufacturing/production engineer

== Related organizations ==
MESA works with a number of related organizations in its work to advance best practices for Operations and Maintenance, including:

- OPC Foundation
- International Society of Automation
- NIST
