= Mark S. Fox =

Canadian computer scientist and Professor of Industrial Engineering

Mark Stephen Fox (born 1952) is a Canadian computer scientist, Professor of Industrial Engineering and Distinguished Professor of Urban Systems Engineering at the University of Toronto, known for the development of Constraint Directed Scheduling in the 1980s and the TOVE Project to develop an ontological framework for enterprise modeling and enterprise integration in the 1990s.

== Biography ==
Fox received his B.Sc. in Computer Science from the University of Toronto in 1975, and his PhD in Computer Science from the Carnegie Mellon University in 1983 with the thesis "Constraint-directed search: a case-study of job-shop scheduling."

Fox started his academic career at Carnegie Mellon University as Associate Professor of Computer Science and Robotics, where he also headed the Center for Integrated Manufacturing Systems of The Robotics Institute. In 1991 he returned to the University of Toronto, where he was appointed Professor of Industrial Engineering at the University of Toronto. He is also Senior Fellow in the Global Cities Institute at the University of Toronto.

He is elected Fellow of the Association for the Advancement of Artificial Intelligence, and elected fellow of the Canadian Institute for Advance Research.

== Work ==
Fox's current research interests concern smart cities, in particular "ontologies for modelling cities and their performance, causal analysis of crowd sourced data (e.g., analysis of reports provided by citizens to the city), and process mapping and analysis of city services (e.g., social services)."

In the past he has been particularly interested the fields of "enterprise engineering (i.e., information technology for business process engineering), constrained-directed reasoning, a unified theory of scheduling, enterprise modelling (i.e., TOVE) and coordination theory."

=== TOVE project ===
Toronto Virtual Enterprise Ontologies, Fox and Gruninger (1998).

The TOVE project, acronym of TOronto Virtual Enterprise project is a project to develop an ontological framework for enterprise integration (EI) based on and suited for enterprise modeling. In the beginning of the 1990s it was initiated by Mark S. Fox and others at the University of Toronto . Initially the project had defined four goals:

1. provides a shared terminology for the enterprise that each agent can jointly understand and use,
2. defines the meaning of each term (aka semantics) in a precise and as unambiguous manner as possible
3. implements the semantics in a set of axioms that will enable TOVE to automatically deduce the answer to many "common sense" questions about the enterprise, and
4. defines a symbology for depicting a term or the concept constructed thereof in a graphical context.

The TOVE framework wants to support reasoning about enterprises, and therefore "provides a characterisation of classes of enterprises by sets of assumptions over their processes, goals, and organization constraints." It has been further developed in the fields of concurrent engineering, supply chain management and business process re-engineering.

=== Enterprise modeling ===
In the 1995 seminal article "Methodology for the Design and Evaluation of Ontologies" (1995) Grüninger and Fox outline the definition and scope of enterprise modelling, stating:

In enterprise modelling, we want to define the actions performed within an enterprise, and define constraints for plans and schedules which are constructed to satisfy the goals of the enterprise. This leads to the following set of informal competency questions:
- Temporal projection - Given a set of actions that occur at different points in the future, what are the properties of resources and activities at arbitrary points in time?
- Planning and scheduling - what sequence of activities must be completed to achieve some goal? At what times must these activities be initiated and terminated?
- Execution monitoring and external events - What are the effects of the occurrence of external and unexpected events (such as machine breakdown or the unavailability of resources) on a plan or schedule?
- Time-based competition - we want to design an enterprise that minimizes the cycle time for a product. This is essentially the task of finding a minimum duration plan that minimizes action occurrences and maximizes concurrency of activities.

== Publications ==
Fox published some books and numerous articles on Artificial Intelligence, Scheduling, Ontologies, and Enterprise Modelling. A selection. Books:

- Mark S. Fox (1983). Constraint-directed search: a case-study of job-shop scheduling. Carnegie-Mellon University
- Peter Bernus and Mark S. Fox eds. (2005). Knowledge sharing in the integrated enterprise : interoperability strategies for the enterprise architect.
- Peter Bernus, Guy Doumeingts, Mark S. Fox (2010). Enterprise Architecture, Integration and Interoperability

Articles, a selection

- 1984. "ISIS—a knowledge‐based system for factory scheduling". With S.F. Smith in: Expert systems 1 (1), p. 25-49
- 1995. "Methodology for the design and evaluation of ontologies". With M. Grüingger in: IJCAI-95 Workshop on basic ontological issues in knowledge sharing, Montreal.
- 1998. "Enterprise Modeling". With M. Gruninger. In: AI magazine. 19 (3), p. 109
- 2000. "Agent-oriented supply-chain management" With M. Barbuceanu and R. Teigen in: International Journal of Flexible Manufacturing Systems 12 (2-3), p. 165-188
