= Theodore J. Williams =

American engineer

Theodore Joseph Williams (1923 – April 27, 2013) was an American engineer and Professor of Engineering at Purdue University, known for the development of the Purdue Enterprise Reference Architecture.

== Biography ==
Williams received his B.S., M.S., and Ph.D. degrees in chemical engineering from the Pennsylvania State University, and another M.S. degree in electrical engineering from Ohio State University.

In World War II, Williams served in the US Air Force as navigator in a B-24, was awarded the Air Medal with two oak leaf clusters, and retired with the rank of captain in 1956. He was Professor of Engineering and Director of the Purdue Laboratory for Applied Industrial Control at Purdue University, West Lafayette, Indiana from 1965 to 1994.

Williams was president of the American Automatic Control Council (AACC) from 1965 to 1967; of the Instrument Society of America (ISA) in 1969; of the American Federation for Information Processing Societies (AFIPS) from 1976 to 1978; and first chairman of the IFAC/IFIP Task Force on Architectures for Integrating Manufacturing Activities and Enterprises from 1990 to 1996. In 1976 Williams was awarded the Sir Harold Hartley Silver Medal by the Institute of Measurement and Control in London, England, and the A. F. Sperry Founder Award Gold Medal by the Instrument Society of America in 1990.

For a more information see Biographical Sketch on the PERA.NET website.

== Publications ==
Williams wrote and edited about 50 books and over 400 articles and papers in the fields from chemical engineering (process dynamics) to computer science (industrial computer control, Computer-integrated manufacturing) and the emerging field of Enterprise Architecture. Books:

1950s

- 1950. Studies in Distillation Calculations. Pennsylvania State College.
- 1956. Automatic Control in Continuous Distillation. Ohio State University
- 1959. The Theory and Design of the Triggered Spark Gap. U.S. Atomic Energy Commission, Division of Technical Information.

1960s

- 1961. Automatic control of chemical and petroleum processes. By Theodore J. Williams and Verlin A. Lauher.
- 1961. Process dynamics and control. Edited by Theodore J. Williams.
- 1961. Systems engineering for the process industries.
- 1965. Process control and applied mathematics. Edited with Lester H. Krone.
- 1966. A Manual for Digital Computer Applications to Process Control. Purdue University.
- 1969. Interface Requirements, Transducers, and Computers for On-line Systems: Survey on Digital Computers in Control. Naczelna Organizacja Techniczna w Polsce.
- 1969. Progress in direct digital control; a compilation of articles, technical papers, and ISA documents reflecting the development and application of DDC concepts in the process industries. Edited with F. M. Ryan.

1970s

- 1970 Coastal Navigation. Thomas Reed
- 1971. Interfaces with the process control computer; the operator, engineer, and management; proceedings of the symposium held August 3–6, 1971, Lafayette, Indiana. Edited by T. J. Williams.
- 1974. Computer applications in the automation of shipyard operation and ship design : proceedings of the IFIP/IFAC/JSNA joint conference, Tokyo, Japan, August 28–30, 1973. Edited with Yuzuru Fujita and Kjell Lind.
- 1974. Modelling and Control of Multiple Effect Black Liquor Evaporator Systems. With Laxmi K. Rastogi. Purdue Laboratory for Applied * 1974. Ship operation automation : proceedings of the IFAC/IFIP symposium, Oslo, Norway, July 2–5, 1973. Edited by Yuzuru Fujita, Kjell Lind and Theodore J. Williams.
- 1975. Modeling and control of kraft production systems for pulp production, chemical recovery, and energy conservation : proceedings of a symposium held by the Pulp and Paper Division of the Instrument Society of America at the ISA/75 Industry Oriented Conferen
- 1976. Computer applications in the automation of shipyard operation and ship design, II : proceedings of the IFIP/IFAC/SSI/City of Gothenburg Scandinavian joint conference, Gothenburg, Sweden, June 8–11, 1976. Edited with Åke Jacobsson, Folke Borgström.
- 1976. Digital Computer Applications to Process Control. Purdue University. Division of Conference and Continuation Services, Purdue Laboratory for Applied Industrial Control
- 1976. IFAC/IFIP Symposium on Automation in Offshore Oil Field Operation, Bergen, Norway, 1976. Automation in offshore oil field operation : proceedings of the IFAC/IFIP Symposium, Bergen, Norway, June 14–17, 1976. Edited with Frode L. Galtung and Kåre Røsandhaug.
- 1976. Ship operation automation, II : proceedings of the 2nd IFAC/IFIP symposium, Washington D.C., USA, August 30-September 2, 1976. Edited with Marvin Pitkin and John J. Roche.
- 1978. Control systems readiness for munitions plants : a first pass : proceedings of the Workshop on Control Systems Readiness for Munitions Plants, held at Purdue University, West Lafayette, Indiana, September 19–20, 1977. Industrial Control, Schools of Engineering, Purdue University.
- 1979. A Mathematical Model of the Babcock and Wilcox Black Liquor Recovery Furnace. With Maurice G. Kamienny and Paavo Uronen. Purdue Laboratory for Applied Industrial Control, Schools of Engineering, Purdue University,
- 1979. Computer applications in the automation of shipyard operation and ship design III : IFIP/IFAC third international conference, University of Strathclyde, Glasgow, Scotland, June 18–21, 1979. Edited with C. Kuo and K. J. MacCallum.

1980s

- 1980. Advanced Control Conference, (6th : 1980 : West Lafayette, Ind.) Man-machine interfaces for industrial control : proceedings of the sixth annual Advanced Control Conference, W. Lafayette, Indiana, April 28–30, 1980. Edited with E. J. Kompass.
- 1980. Hierarchy Computer Systems in Nipon Steel Corporation: A Report on Their Benefits, Particularly in Productivity and Labor Savings, Their Costs and Implementation Efforts. Purdue Laboratory for Applied Industrial Control.
- 1982. A Mathematical Model of the Kraft Pulping Process: Narrative. With Tor Christensen and Lyle Frederick Albright
- 1983. Development of Improved Operating Conditions for Kamyr Digesters. With Yousry L. Sidrak, and Lyle Frederick Albright.
- 1983. Learning Systems and Pattern Recognition in Industrial Control: Applying Artificial Intelligence to Industrial Control; Proceedings of the Ninth Annual Advanced Control Conference, West Lafayette, Indiana, September 19–21, 1983. With E. J. Kompass
- 1983. Modelling, estimation, and control of the soaking pit : an example of the development and application of some modern control techniques to industrial processes. With Yong-Zai Lu.
- 1984. Use of digital computers in process control
- 1985. Analysis and design of hierarchical control systems : with special reference to steel plant operations. Edited by T. J. Williams.
- 1985. Glossary of standard computer control system terminology.
- 1986. Advanced control techniques move from theory to practice : techniques that have made it : proceedings of the twelfth annual Advanced Control Conference, West Lafayette, Indiana, September 15–17, 1986
- 1987. Advanced Control in Computer Integrated Manufacturing. With Henry M. Morris and E. J. Kompass.
- 1988. Standards in information technology and industrial control : contributions from IFIP Working Group 5.4. Edited with Nicolas M. and E. Malagardis.
- 1989. Reference model for computer integrated manufacturing (CIM) : a description from the viewpoint of industrial automation. Edited by Theodore J. Williams.
- 1989, Total control systems availability: its achievement through robustness, fault tolerance, fault analysis, maintainability, and other techniques : proceedings of the fifteenth annual Advanced Control Conference, West Lafayette, Indiana, September 11–13, 1989

1990s

- 1990. Generic Control for Batch Manufacturing: Advanced Control Techniques in Integrated Batch Control : Proceedings of the Sixteenth Annual Advanced Control Conference, West Lafayette, Indiana, September 24–26, 1990. With E. J. Kompass and Sharon K. Whitlock.
- 1991. Expert Systems Applications in Advanced Control: Successes, Techniques, Requirements and Limitations : Proceedings of the Seventeenth Annual Advanced Control Conference, West Lafayette, Indiana, September 30- October 2, 1991
- 1992. Evaluation of Underhand Backfill Practice for Rock Burst Control. With Jeff K. Whyatt and M. P. Board,
- 1992. Instrumentation of an Experimental Underhand Longwall Stope. With M. E. Poad, Jeff K. Whyatt
- 1992. Rock mechanics investigations at the Lucky Friday mine.
- 1992. Purdue enterprise reference architecture : a technical guide for CIM planning and implementation.
- 1996. Architectures for Enterprise Integration. With Peter Bernus and Laszlo Nemes. Springer, 31 mrt. 1996
- 1999. We went to war. With Barbara J. Gotham.

Articles, a selection

- 1960. "A generalized chemical processing model for the investigation of computer control." With Robert E. Otto in: American Institute of Electrical Engineers, Part I: Communication and Electronics, Transactions of the 79.5. p. 458-473
- 1992. The Purdue enterprise reference architecture: a technical guide for CIM planning and implementation. Research Triangle Park, NC: Instrument Society of America.
- 1993. "The Purdue enterprise reference architecture." Proceedings of the JSPE/IFIP TC5/WG5. 3 Workshop on the Design of Information Infrastructure Systems for Manufacturing. North-Holland Publishing Co.
- 1994. "The Purdue enterprise reference architecture." Computers in industry Vol 24 (2). p. 141-158
