= Manufacturing operations management =

Manufacturing operations management (MOM) is a collection of systems for managing end-to-end manufacturing processes with a view to optimizing efficiency.

There are many types of MOM software, including for production management, performance analysis, quality and compliance, and human machine interface (HMI). Production management software provides real-time information about jobs and orders, labor and materials, machine status, and product shipments. Performance analysis software displays metrics at the machine, line, plant and enterprise level for situational or historical analysis. Quality and compliance software is used to promote compliance with standards and specifications for operational processes and procedures. HMI software is a form of manufacturing operations management (MOM) software that enables operators to manage industrial and process control machinery using a computer-based interface.

Emerging Software Trends

Advancements in technology and market demands are enabling new capabilities in MOM software platforms, gradually closing gaps in end-user needs.

- Collaboration Capabilities: Collaboration and workflow services support people-to-people, people-to-systems, and systems-to-systems interactions, enforcing procedures and rules while flexibly adapting to real-time situations with alternate workflows and processes.
- Security Services: Future manufacturing platforms will leverage common security services that determine roles, responsibilities, authorities, and access across all systems and application functions while fitting into corporate IT security schemes.
- Asset & Production Model: Future manufacturing platforms will have a unified asset and production model that supports all of the interrelationships between physical production equipment, facilities, inventory/materials and people, as well as production definitions such as the manufacturing bill of materials, productions orders, etc. This contrasts with older systems that either had subsets of these interrelationships across multiple databases, or could not effectively deal with federating across multiple systems of record.
- Operations Database & Historians: Evolving from older systems that had separate historians and production databases that were difficult to correlate across, service-based platforms will have a unified operations database and historian. This will capture and aggregate all time-series and production event information surrounding everything involved in each product and production run with a full genealogy of components and materials, related performance information, and federation across other systems and devices of record.
- Visualization and Mobility: Today, different MOM applications support different graphical user interfaces, Web interfaces, specific mobile applications, etc. The future manufacturing platform will provide common visualization and mobility for a consistent user interface experience across different form factors, supporting dedicated and mobile workers that are orchestrated by consistent workflows and procedures.
- Smaller and Focused 'Apps': Today’s monolithic systems and applications have too many interdependencies of databases, operate inconsistently, and are not inherently integrated. Being able to take advantage of many of the common software platform services described above, modular apps will be significantly smaller, simpler, and focused. These apps will be much lighter weight in functionality, and, as a result, significantly easier and faster to develop.

== See also ==
- Manufacturing execution system
- Manufacturing process management
- Operations execution system
- Product life cycle management
