= Process development execution system =

Process development execution systems (PDES) are software systems used to guide the development of high-tech manufacturing technologies like semiconductor manufacturing, MEMS manufacturing, photovoltaics manufacturing, biomedical devices or nanoparticle manufacturing. Software systems of this kind have similarities to product lifecycle management (PLM) systems. They guide the development of new or improved technologies from its conception, through development and into manufacturing. Furthermore, they borrow on concepts of manufacturing execution systems (MES) systems but tailor them for R&D rather than for production. PDES integrate people (with different backgrounds from potentially different legal entities), data (from diverse sources), information, knowledge and business processes.

== Benefits ==
PDES vs MES in the technology development cycle

Documented benefits of process development execution systems include:

- Reduced time to market
- Reduced amounts of experimentation
- Improved quality / more robust manufacturing process
- Reduced prototyping costs
- Savings through the re-use of original data, information and knowledge
- A framework for product optimization
- Reduced waste
- Savings through the complete integration of engineering workflows
- Ability to provide collaboration partners with access to a centralized development record

== Relationships with other level 3 / level 4 systems ==
A process development execution system (PDES) is a system used by companies to perform development activities for high-tech manufacturing processes. Software systems of this kind leverage diverse concepts from other software categories like PLM, manufacturing execution system (MES), ECM but focus on tools to speed up the technology development rather than the production.

A PDES is similar to a manufacturing execution systems (MES) in several ways. The key distinguishing factor of a PDES is that it is tailored for steering the development of a manufacturing process, while MES is tailored for executing the volume production using the developed process. Therefore, the toolset and focus of a PDES is on lower volume but higher flexibility and experimentation freedom. The tools of an MES are more focused on less variance, higher volumes, tighter control and logistics. Both types of application software increase traceability, productivity, and quality of the delivered result. For PDESs quality refers to the capability of the process to perform without failure under a wide range of conditions, i.e. the robustness of the developed manufacturing process. For MESs quality refers to the quality of the manufactured good/commodity. Additionally both software types share functions including equipment tracking, product genealogy, labour and item tracking, costing, electronic signature capture, defect and resolution monitoring, executive dashboards, and other various reporting solutions.

In contrast to PLM systems, PDES typically address the collaboration and innovation challenges with a bottom-up approach. They start-out with the details of manufacturing technologies (like PPLM), a single manufacturing step with all its physical aware parameterization and integrating steps into sequences, into devices, into systems, etc.

Other rather similar software categories are laboratory information management systems (LIMS) and laboratory information system (LIS). PDESs offer a wider set of functionalities e.g. virtual manufacturing techniques, while they are typically not integrated with the equipment in the laboratory.

PDESs have many parts and can be deployed on various scales – from simple work in progress tracking, to a complex solution integrated throughout an enterprise development infrastructure. The latter connects with other enterprise systems like enterprise resource and planning systems (ERPs), manufacturing execution systems (MESs), product lifecycle management (PLM), supervisory, control and data acquisition (SCADA) solutions and scheduling and planning systems (both long-term and short-term tactical).

== Example: PDES usage during semiconductor device development ==
New ideas for manufacturing processes (for new goods/commodities or improved manufacturing) are often based on, or can at least benefit from, previous developments and recipes already in use. The same is true when developing new devices, for example, a MEMS sensor or actuator. A PDES offers an easy way to access these previous developments in a structured manner. Information can be retrieved faster, and previous results can be taken into account more efficiently. A PDES typically offers means to display and search for result data from different viewpoints, and to categorise the data according to the different aspects. These functionalities are applied to all result data, such as materials, process steps, machines, experiments, documents and pictures. The PDES also provides a way to relate entities belonging to the same or similar context and to explore the resulting information.

In the assembly phase from process steps to process flows, a PDES helps to easily build, store, print, and transfer new process flows. By providing access to previously assembled process flows the designer is able to use those as building blocks or modules in the newly developed flow. The usage of standard building blocks can dramatically reduce the design time and the probability of errors.

A PDES demonstrates its real benefits in the verification phase. Knowledge (for example in the semiconductor device fabrication – clean before deposition; After polymer spin-on no temperature higher than 100 °C until resist is removed) is provided in a format that can be interpreted by a computer as rules. If a domain expert enters the rules for his/her process steps, all engineers can later use these rules to check newly developed process flows, even if the domain expert is not available. For a PDES, this means it has to be able to

1. manage rules
2. connect rules with Boolean terms (and, or, not) and
3. check process flows using these rules. This rule check verifies the principle manufacturability of a newly designed manufacturing flow.

The processing rule check gives no indication about the functionality or even the structure of the produced good or device. In the area of semiconductor device fabrication, the techniques of semiconductor process simulation / TCAD can provide an idea about the produced structures. To support this 'virtual fabrication', a PDES is able to manage simulation models for process steps. Usually the simulation results are seen as standalone data. To rectify this situation PDESs are able to manage the resulting files in combination with the process flow. This enables the engineer to easily compare the expected results with the simulated outcome. The knowledge gained from the comparison can again be used to improve the simulation model.

After virtual verification the device is produced in an experimental fabrication environment. A PDES allows a transfer of the process flow to the fabrication environment (for example in semiconductor: fab). This can be done by simply printing out a runcard for the operator or by interfacing to the manufacturing execution systems (MES) of the facility. On the other hand, a PDES is able to manage and document last minute changes to the flow like parameter adjustments during the fabrication. During and after processing a lot of measurements are taken. The results of these measurements are often produced in the form of files such as images or simple text files containing rows and columns of data. The PDES is able to manage these files, to link related results together, and to manage different versions of certain files, for example reports. Paired with flexible text, and graphical retrieval and search methods, a PDES provides the mechanism to view and assess the accumulated data, information and knowledge from different perspectives. It provides insight into both the information aspects as well as the time aspects of previous developments.

Development activities within high tech industries are an increasingly collaborative effort. This leads to the need to exchange information between the partners or to transfer process intellectual property from a vendor to a customer. PDESs' support this transfer while being selective to protect the IPR of the company.

== See also ==
- Microfabrication
- Semiconductor device fabrication
- Microelectromechanical systems
- Product information management system (PIMS)
