= Michael Uschold =

American computer scientist

Michael F. Uschold
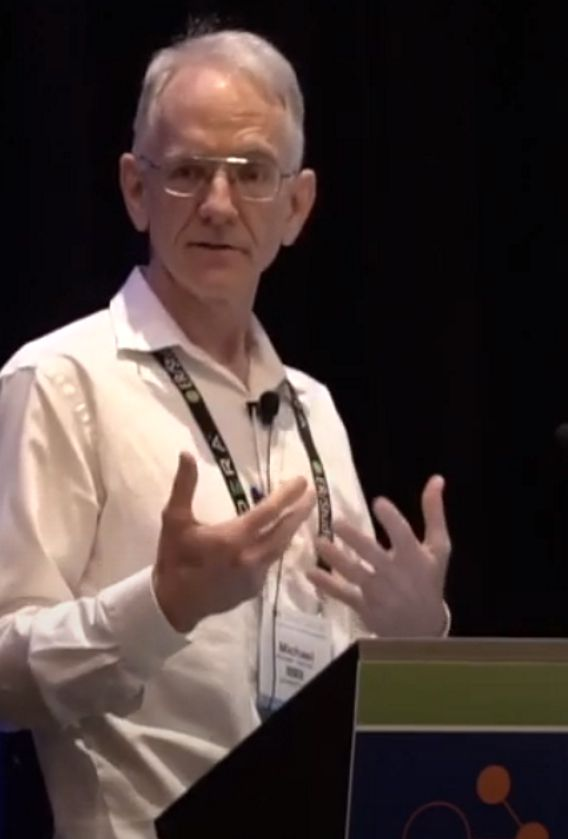
- Michael Uschold, 2016
- Born: 1955 (age 70–71)
- Education: Canisius College, Rutgers University, University of Edinburgh
- Occupations: Computer scientist, artificial intelligence researcher, consultant
- Employer(s): University of Edinburgh, Boeing Phantom Works
- Known for: Knowledge representation, ontology

Michael F. Uschold (born 1955) is an American computer scientist, Artificial Intelligence researcher, and consultant known for his work on knowledge representation and ontology.

== Biography ==
Uschold received his BA in Mathematics and Physics in 1977 from Canisius College, his MS in Computer Science in 1981 from Rutgers University, and his Ph.D. in Artificial Intelligence in 1991 from the University of Edinburgh.

In 1983, Uschold joined the faculty of the University of Edinburgh, Department of Artificial Intelligence, as a researcher and lecturer, and later moved to its Artificial Intelligence Applications Institute. In 1997, he left the academic world and became a research scientist at Boeing Phantom Works, a division of The Boeing Company, specializing in advanced prototyping. In 2007, he became a senior ontologist at a computer science consulting firm; in 2009, he started as an independent consultant; and since 2010, he has participated in a management consulting firm.

Uschold's research interests and expertise are in the fields of "software concept design and architecture; facilitation, analysis, and modeling; asking probing questions; getting to the heart of the matter; and communication of complex information in simple terms. Writing, speaking, and presenting; constructive reviewing and critiquing; and semantic technology."

== Selected publications ==
Papers and articles, a selection:

- Uschold, Michael, and Martin King. Towards a methodology for building ontologies. Artificial Intelligence Applications Institute, University of Edinburgh, 1995.
- Uschold, Michael. Building ontologies: Towards a unified methodology. Technical. Report AIAI-TR-195, Artificial Intelligence Applications Institute, The University of Edinburgh, 1996.
- Uschold, Mike, and Michael Gruninger. "Ontologies: Principles, methods and applications." Knowledge Engineering Review 11.2 (1996): 93–136.
- Uschold, M., King, M., Moralee, S., & Zorgios, Y. (1998). "The enterprise ontology." The Knowledge Engineering Review, 13(01), 31–89.
- Jasper, Robert, and Mike Uschold. "A framework for understanding and classifying ontology applications." Proceedings 12th Int. Workshop on Knowledge Acquisition, Modelling, and Management KAW. Vol. 99. 1999.
- Uschold, Michael. "Demystifying OWL for the Enterprise", Morgan & Claypool, Publishers, 2018.
