= Michael Gruninger =

Canadian computer scientist

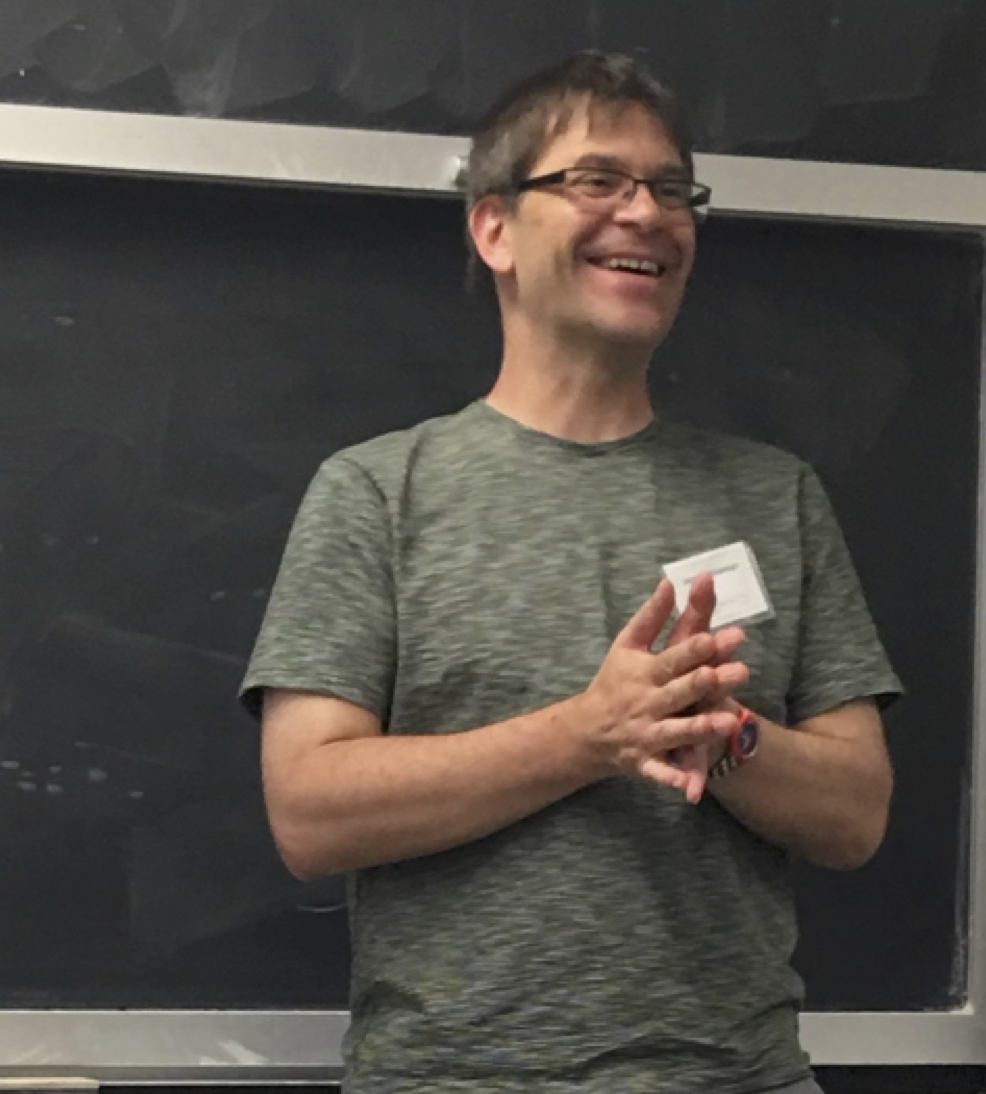
- Michael Gruninger at Summer Institute for Upper Ontologies at University of Toronto, August 2017
- Born: Magrath, Alberta, Canada
- Education: University of Alberta, University of Toronto
- Known for: Process Specification Language; Common Logic; TOVE competency questions upper ontologies
- Scientific career
- Fields: Applied Ontology, Knowledge Representation
- Workplaces: University of Toronto, National Institute of Standards and Technology
- Doctoral advisor: Raymond Reiter

Michael Gruninger is a Canadian computer scientist and Professor of Industrial Engineering at the University of Toronto, known for his work on Ontologies in information science. particularly with the Process Specification Language, and in enterprise modelling on the TOVE Project with Mark S. Fox.

== Biography ==
Gruninger studied computer Science and received his BA in 1987 at the University of Alberta, and his MA in 1989 at the university, where in 2000 he also received his PhD with a thesis entitled "Logical foundations of shape-based object recognition."

In 1993 Gruninger started as researcher at the Enterprise Integration Laboratory of the University of Toronto, Department of Mechanical and Industrial Engineering. From 2000 to 2005 he was researcher at the Institute for Systems Research at the University of Maryland, College Park and a guest researcher at the Manufacturing Systems Integration Division of the National Institute of Standards and Technology (NIST). Since 2005 he has been a Professor of Industrial Engineering at the University of Toronto, where he leads the Semantic Technologies Laboratory.

Gruninger's research interests are in the field of "the design and formal characterization of theories in mathematical logic and their application to problems in manufacturing and enterprise engineering."

Gruninger is President of the International Association of Ontology and its Applications (IAOA) and Editor-in-Chief of the Applied Ontology Journal.

== Publications ==
Gruninger authored and co-authored numerous publications in his fields of expertise. A selection:

- Gruninger, Michael, and Mark S. Fox. "Methodology for the Design and Evaluation of Ontologies." (1995).
- Uschold, Mike, and Michael Gruninger. "Ontologies: Principles, methods and applications." Knowledge engineering review 11.2 (1996): 93-136.
- Fox, Mark S., and Michael Gruninger. "Enterprise modeling." AI magazine 19.3 (1998): 109.
- Gruninger, Michael, and Jintae Lee. "ONTOLOGY." Communications of the ACM 45.2 (2002): 39.
- Uschold, Michael, and Michael Gruninger. "Ontologies and semantics for seamless connectivity." ACM SIGMod Record 33.4 (2004): 58-64.
