= ANSI/ISA-95 =

International manufacturing standard

ANSI/ISA-95, or ISA-95 as it is more commonly referred, is an international standard from the International Society of Automation for developing an automated interface between enterprise and control systems. This standard has been developed for global manufacturers. It was developed to be applied in all industries, and in all sorts of processes, like batch processes, continuous and repetitive processes.

== Objectives ==
The objectives of ISA-95 are to provide consistent terminology that is a foundation for supplier and manufacturer communications, provide consistent information models, and to provide consistent operations models which is a foundation for clarifying application functionality and how information is to be used.

== Standard parts ==
There are 5 parts of the ISA-95 standard.

=== Part 1: Models and Terminology ===
ANSI/ISA-95.00.01-2000, Enterprise-Control System Integration Part 1: Models and Terminology consists of standard terminology and object models, which can be used to decide which information should be exchanged.

The models help define boundaries between the enterprise systems and the control systems. They help address questions like which tasks can be executed by which function and what information must be exchanged between applications. Here is a.

ISA-95 Models

- Context
- Hierarchy Models
  - Scheduling and control (Purdue)
  - Equipment hierarchy
- Functional Data Flow Model
  - Manufacturing Functions
  - Data Flows
- Object Models
  - Objects
  - Object Relationships
  - Object Attributes
- Operations Activity Models
  - Operations Elements: PO, MO, QO, IO
  - Operations Data Flow Model
    - Operations Functions
    - Operations Flows

=== Part 2: Object Model Attributes ===
ANSI/ISA-95.00.02-2001, Enterprise-Control System Integration Part 2: Object Model Attributes consists of attributes for every object that is defined in part 1. The objects and attributes of Part 2 can be used for the exchange of information between different systems, but these objects and attributes can also be used as the basis for relational databases.

=== Part 3: Models of Manufacturing Operations Management ===
ANSI/ISA-95.00.03-2005, Enterprise-Control System Integration, Part 3: Models of Manufacturing Operations Management focuses on the functions and activities at level 3 (Production / MES layer). It provides guidelines for describing and comparing the production levels of different sites in a standardized way.

=== Part 4: Object models and attributes for Manufacturing Operations Management ===
ISA-95.00.04 Object Models & Attributes Part 4 of ISA-95: "Object models and attributes for Manufacturing Operations Management" The SP95 committee is yet developing part 4 of ISA-95, which is entitled "Object Models and Attributes of Manufacturing Operations Management". This technical specification defines object models that determine which information is exchanged between MES activities (which are defined in part 3 by ISA-95). The models and attributes from part 4 are the basis for the design and the implementation of interface standards and make sure of a flexible lapse of the cooperation and information-exchange between the different MES activities.

=== Part 5: Business to manufacturing transactions ===
ISA-95.00.05 B2M Transactions Part 5 of ISA-95: "Business to manufacturing transactions" Also part 5 of ISA-95 is yet in development. This technical specification defines operation between office and production automations-systems, which can be used together with the object models out part 1 & 2. The operations connect and organise the production objects and activities that are defined through earlier parts of the standard. Such operations take place on all levels within a business, but the focus of this technical specification lies on the interface between enterprise- and control systems. On the basis of models, the operation will be described and becomes the operation processing logically explained.

Within production areas activities are executed and information is passed back and forth. The standard provides reference models for production activities, quality activities, maintenance activities and inventory activities.

== See also ==
- International Society of Automation
- IEC 62264
- Manufacturing execution system
- Manufacturing operations management
