= International Society of Automation =

Non-commercial Organization

- Abbreviation: ISA
- Formation: April 28, 1945; 81 years ago
- Founder: Richard Rimbach
- Founded at: Pittsburgh, Pennsylvania
- Type: NGO
- Legal status: Professional association
- Headquarters: Research Triangle Park, North Carolina
- Region served: Worldwide
- Services: automation training, events, standards, publications, networking
- Members: 17,000 (2025)
- Official language: English
- President: Ashley Weckwerth, P.E.
- Staff: 69
- Website: isa.org
- Formerly called: -The Instrumentation, Systems, and Automation Society -Instrumentation Society of America
- References; Historical data

The International Society of Automation (ISA) Is a non-profit technical society for engineers, technicians, businesspeople, educators and students, who work, study or are interested in automation and pursuits related to it, such as instrumentation. Originally known as the Instrumentation Society of America, the society is more commonly known by its acronym, ISA. The society's scope now includes many technical and engineering disciplines.

ISA is one of the foremost professional organizations in the world for setting standards and educating industry professionals in automation. Instrumentation and automation are some of the key technologies involved in nearly all industrialized manufacturing. Modern industrial manufacturing is a complex interaction of numerous systems. Instrumentation provides regulation for these complex systems using many different measurement and control devices. Automation provides the programmable devices that permit greater flexibility in the operation of these complex manufacturing systems.

ISA is well known for its standards program, which surrounds topics in instrumentation, control systems, operational technology (OT) cybersecurity, and more. Prominent standards developed by ISA include:

- ISA/IEC 62443 series of standards, the world's only consensus-based security standard for automation and control system applications
- ISA-95, Enterprise Control System Integration
- ISA-101, Human-Machine Interfaces
- ISA-18.2, Management of Alarm Systems
- ISA-5.1, Instrumentation Symbols and Diagrams

== Structure ==
The International Society of Automation is a non-profit member-driven organization, which is built on a backbone of volunteers. Volunteers, working together with the ISA's full-time staff, are key to the ongoing mission and success of the organization. ISA has a strong leadership development program that develops volunteer leaders as they get involved with the organization's many different facets. ISA has several different ways that volunteers get involved from the geographic section, training, events, and standards roots of the organization.

ISA members are typically assigned an ISA Section (local chapter) which is related to their geographic location. ISA Standards Committees are open to broad participation from all interested stakeholders regardless of geographic location or membership status.

== History ==
ISA was officially established as the Instrument Society of America on 28 April 1945, in Pittsburgh, Pennsylvania. The society grew out of the desire of 18 local instrument societies to form a national organization. It was the brainchild of Richard Rimbach of the Instruments Publishing Company. Rimbach is recognized as the founder of ISA. Industrial instruments, which became widely used during World War II, continued to play an ever-greater role in the expansion of technology after the war. Individuals like Rimbach and others involved in industry saw a need for the sharing of information about instruments on a national basis, as well as for standards and uniformity. The Instrument Society of America addressed that need. Albert F. Sperry, chairman of Panelit Corporation, became ISA's first president in 1946. In that same year, the Society held its first conference and exhibit in Pittsburgh. The first standard, RP 5.1 Instrument Flow Plan Symbols, followed in 1949, and the first journal was published in 1954. In the years following, ISA continued to expand its products and services, increasing the size and scope of the ISA conference and exhibition, offering professional development and training, and even producing films about measurement and control.

Membership grew from 900 in 1946 to 6,900 in 1953, and as of 2025, ISA members number approximately 17,000 from over 100 countries.

In 1980, ISA moved its headquarters to Research Triangle Park (RTP), North Carolina, and a training center was established in nearby Raleigh. In 2022, the headquarters and training center were consolidated in a new building in RTP, where the society's day-to-day activities are managed by a professional staff.

Recognizing the fact that ISA's technical scope had grown beyond instruments and that its reach went beyond "America," in the fall of 2000 the ISA Council of Society Delegates approved a legal name change to ISA—The Instrumentation, Systems, and Automation Society. In 2008, the Council voted to rename the society to the International Society of Automation to reflect its global nature and membership base. Today, ISA's corporate branding strategy focuses exclusively on the letters, though ISA's official, legal name is the International Society of Automation.

== Membership ==
ISA membership is organized into particular grades: Life, Fellow, Senior Member, Member, and Student Member. Professional members pay dues of $154 per year, and student dues are $15 annually.

The benefits of ISA membership include, among other things, affiliation with an ISA section (see below), discounts on ISA's products, events and services, and access to technical documents and knowledge through the ISA content portal, Pub Hub.

== Sections and districts ==
Local ISA chapters are known as ISA Sections. Sections are commonly organized around a specific geographic area, e.g. Seattle Section, Connecticut Valley Section, Greater Oklahoma Section, France Section etc. There are 103 chartered sections in 33 countries in North America, South America, Europe, Asia, Africa, and the Middle East.

Many sections sponsor training courses, conduct periodic trade shows, and act as a resource to the local industrial community. Reflecting their primacy in ISA's early days, sections retain pre-eminent governance authority, as ISA's legislative body, the Council of Society Delegates, is composed of section representatives (delegates) who hold voting power equal to the size of their membership.

ISA also has nearly 200 student sections, in locations all over the world, principally where the economy has a substantial manufacturing component, and instrumentation and industrial automation are vital academic programs. Some student sections have found it difficult to remain active, as it is necessary to continually replace graduates with newer students, and membership is consequently very fluid.

Sections are located within districts, of which there are 14, and which comprise large geographic areas of the world. Each one is headed by a vice president. Districts 1,2,3,5,6,7,8,9, and 11 are in the US (although District 7 also includes Mexico and Central America, and District 3 includes Puerto Rico). Districts 10 and 13 are in Canada. District 4 is South America (including the Trinidad Section). District 12 is Europe and the Middle East, and District 14 is the Asia-Pacific sphere. ISA formerly had geographic subdivisions known as "regions", which were part of the short lived "ISA International" (1988–1996). At varying intervals following the disestablishment of ISA International, the European Region became District 12, the India Region became District 14, and the South America Region became District 4 .

== Standards ==
ISA standards play a major role in the work of instrumentation and automation professionals. Many ISA standards have been recognized by the American National Standards Institute (ANSI) as approved American National Standards.

=== Standards committees ===
ISA standards are developed using a consensus-based model employing volunteer standards committees of automation professionals from across industries. The ANSI standards development model is used with standards committees having the characteristics of Openness, Lack of Dominance, Balance, Consensus and a Right of Appeal. All ISA standards processes are overseen by the ISA Standards & Practices Board.

As of 2025, there were more than 3500 participating individuals on ISA standards committees, from over 40 countries.

ISA standards cover a wide range of concepts of importance to instrumentation and automation professionals. ISA has standards committees for symbols and nomenclature used within the industry, safety standards for equipment in non-hazardous and hazardous environments, communications standards to permit interoperable equipment availability from several manufacturers, and additional committees for standards on many more technical issues of importance to the industry. An example of one significant ISA standard is the ANSI/ISA-50.02 Fieldbus Standard for Use in Industrial Control Systems, which is a product of the ISA-50 Signal Compatibility of Electrical Instruments committee. Another significant ISA standard family is the batch processing standards of ANSI/ISA-88.00.01 Models and Terminology, ANSI/ISA-88.00.02 Data Structures and Guidelines for Languages, and ANSI/ISA-88.00.03 General and Site Recipe Models and Representation, which are products of the ISA-88 Batch Control committee.

Other standards developed by ISA include:

ISA100.11a is for testing and certification of wireless products and systems. This standard was approved by the International Electrotechnical Commission (IEC) as a publicly available specification, or PAS in September 2011.

ISA95 is an international standard for developing an automated interface between enterprise and control systems.

As of 2025, the Society has over 135 published standards, recommended practices, and technical reports.

=== Security Standards for Automation and Control Systems ===
The International Society of Automation also produces the ISA-62443 standards as part of the information security standards. The security of private industries and governmental installations are often dependent on the reliable functioning of an Industrial control system. This is a highly debated subject that has considerable importance for the security of the critical infrastructure of any country. For example: International Society of Automation security standards are mentioned on the United States Computer Emergency Response Team website.

The ISA has formed the ISA Security Compliance Institute to promote and designate cyber-secure products and practices for industrial automation suppliers and operational sites.

== Conferences and Events ==
=== Conferences ===
ISA hosts two major international conferences per year: the OT Cybersecurity Summit, typically held in late spring, and the Automation Summit and Expo, held in the fall. In 2025, the OT Cybersecurity Summit will be held in Brussels, Belgium, and the Automation Summit and Expo will be held in Lake Buena Vista, Florida.

=== Local section events ===
ISA Sections will often host their own local trade shows, conferences, member events, and/or sponsored training in their individual geographic areas.

== Publishing ==
=== Periodicals ===
The quarterly publication ISA Transactions, published by Elsevier, is a refereed journal of scholarly material, for which the intended audience is research and development personnel from academy and industry in the field of process instrumentation, systems, and automation.

=== Books ===
ISA publishes and distributes books which offer thorough coverage of the world of automation. ISA books are organized by the technical categories which are generally considered as defining automation:

- Basic continuous control
- Basic discrete, sequencing and manufacturing control
- Advanced control
- Reliability, safety, and electrical
- Integration and software
- Deployment and maintenance
- Work structure

=== Standards ===
The ISA publishes its standards, recommended practices and technical reports in a variety of formats. These include printed hardcopy, downloadable PDF, web-based viewable, and network licenses.

== Training, certification and education ==
=== Training ===
ISA training products include classroom-based training, mobile training courses, in-plant training, online courses, and printed course materials. The ISA also provides in-house training for a number of large corporations.

=== Pub Hub ===
The ISA has an online, searchable collection of technical content available to its members. Pub Hub hosts hundreds of essential resources, including ISA standards, best practices, technical reports, InTech magazine archives, webinars, and e-books.

=== Certification programs ===
ISA manages two certification programs, Certified Automation Professional (CAP), and Certified Control Systems Technician (CCST). Each of these is designed to be an objective, third-party assessment and confirmation of an individual's professional abilities and technical skills. Each certification is granted based on a combination of formal education/training, professional experience, and performance on a written examination.

The CCST program was established in the early 1990s and because of an obvious industry need, rapidly gained credibility. There are now approximately 4,000 ISA certified technicians worldwide.

The CAP program, launched in 2004, is still in the process of becoming established within the industrial community and gaining recognition. As of 2012, there are over 500 certified CAPs worldwide.

The ISA used to have a third certification program called Certified Industrial Maintenance Mechanic (CIMM) which was established in 2004. In 2010, the CIMM program was transferred to the Society for Maintenance and Reliability Professionals. The SMRP renamed the CIMM certification to the Certified Maintenance and Reliability Technician (CMRT).
