= Single-entry single-exit =

Single-Entry Single-Exit (SESE) regions are a fundamental concept in structured programming and control-flow analysis. A SESE region is a portion of a program with exactly one entry point and one exit point, enabling modular reasoning, formal verification, and compiler optimization. Although the term SESE was popularized in the late 1980s, the underlying ideas date back to the origins of structured programming and the development of flow-graph theory in the 1970s.

== Concept and definition ==
In a control-flow graph (CFG), a SESE region is typically defined as a subgraph with:

1. One entry edge that dominates all nodes in the region;
2. One exit edge that post-dominates all nodes in the region;
3. No other edges entering or leaving the subgraph.

A node x is said to dominate node y in a directed graph if every path from start to y includes x. A node x is said to post-dominate a node y if every path from y to the end includes x.

- The first condition ensures that every path from the start of the CFG into the region passes through the region's designated entry edge.
- The second condition ensures that every path from within the region to the end of the CFG passes through the region's designated exit edge.
- The first two conditions are necessary but not sufficient to characterize SESE regions: dominance and postdominance alone do not prohibit edges (including backedges) that enter or leave the region without passing through the designated entry or exit.
- The third condition enforces boundary integrity: no edge may enter the region except through the designated entry edge, and no edge may leave the region except through the designated exit edge. This excludes side entrances, side exits, and backedges that would otherwise satisfy dominance and post-dominance.

This definition makes SESE regions mechanically identifiable and suitable for static analysis.

== Origins in structured programming (1960s) ==
The conceptual roots of SESE lie in structured programming, developed in the 1960s to address the complexity caused by unrestricted jumps (goto). In 1964, Böhm defined a primitive programming language — P′′ — that was explicitly based on the SESE property:

a) It is only possible to enter a cycle from its first instruction, ...
b) It is only possible to exit a cycle from its last instruction.

— Böhm (1964)

Böhm and Jacopini (1966) showed that any program can be written using sequence, selection, and iteration. Dijkstra (1968) argued that programs must have a clear control structure to be understandable and provably correct. Hoare (1969), defining a logic for program correctness, assumed well-defined entry and exit points.

All structured control constructs introduced in this period naturally obey the single-entry single-exit discipline.

== Formalization in flow-graph theory (1970s) ==
Early work on control-flow analysis laid the foundation for the flow-graph representations used in SESE regions. The control-flow graph (CFG) was first introduced in the context of compiler optimization by Frances E. Allen, who formalized CFGs as representations of basic blocks and control flow, providing a basis for dominance analysis and other structural techniques used in SESE identification.

Kosaraju used these CFG representations to give SESE regions their formal graph-theoretic characterization. He defined single-entry single-exit regions within control-flow graphs and showed how structured programs can be decomposed into hierarchically nested SESE regions corresponding to standard control constructs such as conditionals and loops. This work demonstrated that the SESE structure is not merely a stylistic guideline but a property that enables systematic program decomposition and facilitates formal program analysis and reasoning.

In the early to mid-1970s, Aho, Hopcroft, and Ullman (AHU) extended these ideas, developing formal frameworks for:

- CFGs
- Dominator theory
- Intervals and reducible regions

Intervals define single-entry regions within a CFG. Although AHU did not explicitly use the term SESE, their framework provided the mathematical basis for identifying regions with disciplined entry and exit behavior.

== SESE as an explicit analytical unit (1980s) ==
The term Single-Entry Single-Exit (SESE) was explicitly named and popularized by Ferrante, Ottenstein, and Warren (1987).

Their contributions include:

- A precise SESE definition using domination and post-domination
- Systematic decomposition of programs into SESE regions
- Use of SESE regions as the structural basis for program dependence graphs (PDGs)

Ferrante et al. explicitly credited AHU for the underlying flow-graph theory.

== Applications ==
SESE regions are central to:

- Program slicing
- Code refactoring
- Compiler optimization
- Parallelization and dependence analysis
- Formal verification

Because SESE regions isolate control flow, they allow transformations and reasoning to be performed locally while preserving global correctness.

== See also ==
- Control-flow graph
- Program slicing
- Program dependence graph
- Structured programming
- Structured program theorem

== Bibliography ==
- Aho, Alfred V.; Ullman, Jeffrey D. (1977). Principles of Compiler Design. Reading, Massachusetts, USA: Addison-Wesley. ISBN 978-0-201-00022-1. Predecessor to Aho, Sethi & Ullman (1986); contains early discussion of flow graphs, dominance, and parsing theory
- Aho, Alfred V.; Sethi, Ravi; Ullman, Jeffrey D. (1986). Compilers: Principles, Techniques, and Tools (1st ed.). Reading, Massachusetts, USA: Addison-Wesley. ISBN 0-201-10194-7. An alternative reference is this book's predecessor, Aho & Ullman (1977)
- Allen, Frances E. (July 1970). "Control flow analysis". SIGPLAN Notices. 5 (7): 1–19. doi:10.1145/390013.808479.
- Böhm, Corrado (1964). "On a family of Turing machines and the related programming language" (PDF). ICC Bulletin. 3: 185–194.
- Böhm, Corrado; Jacopini, Giuseppe [in Italian] (May 1966). "Flow Diagrams, Turing Machines and Languages with Only Two Formation Rules". Communications of the ACM. 9 (5): 366–371. doi:10.1145/355592.365646. S2CID 10236439.. Republished in Yourdon 1979, pp. 13–25
- Dijkstra, Edsger W. (1968). "Go To Statement Considered Harmful". Communications of the ACM. 11 (3): 147–148. doi:10.1145/362929.362947.
- Ferrante, Jeanne; Ottenstein, Karl J.; Warren, Joe D. (1987). "The Program Dependence Graph and Its Use in Optimization". ACM Transactions on Programming Languages and Systems. 9 (3). Association for Computing Machinery: 319–349. doi:10.1145/24039.24041.
- Hoare, C. A. R. (October 1969). "An Axiomatic Basis for Computer Programming". Communications of the ACM. 12 (10): 576–580. doi:10.1145/363235.363259.
- Johnson, Richard; Pearson, David; Pingali, Keshav (1994). The Program Structure Tree: Computing Control Regions in Linear Time. Proceedings of the ACM SIGPLAN 1994 Conference on Programming Language Design and Implementation (PLDI '94). Orlando, Florida, USA: Association for Computing Machinery (ACM). pp. 171–185. doi:10.1145/773473.178258.
- Kosaraju, S. Rao (1974). "Analysis of Structured Programs". Journal of Computer and System Sciences. 9 (3): 232–255. doi:10.1145/800125.804055.
- Yourdon, E. N., ed. (1979). Classics in Software Engineering. New York, NY: Yourdon Press. pp. xi, 424. ISBN 978-0-917072-14-7. LCCN 79-63449.
