= Structure theorem =

Structure theorem may refer to:

- Structured program theorem, a result in programming language theory
- Structure theorem for finitely generated modules over a principal ideal domain, a result in abstract algebra (a subject area in mathematics)
- Structure Theorem of Bass-Serre theory, a result in Geometric group theory. (another subject area in mathematics)
