= Fortissimo (disambiguation) =

Fortissimo is a term in music dynamics meaning "to be played very loudly."

Fortissimo may also refer to:

- Fortissimo Records, a records label
- Fortissimo Films, a distribution and production company that focuses on independent and Asian cinema
- Fortissimo space, a concept in topology
- "Fortissimo" (song), a 1966 song of Rita Pavone
