= Namioka =

Namioka may refer to:

- Namioka (surname), a Japanese surname
- Namioka, Aomori, a former town in Minamitsugaru District, Aomori Prefecture, Japan
- Namioka Station, a railway station in Aomori, Aomori Prefecture Japan
