= Earl A. Coddington =

American mathematician

- Born: December 16, 1920; Washington, D.C.
- Died: November 11, 1991 (aged 70); Los Angeles, California
- Education: Johns Hopkins University
- Scientific career
- Fields: Mathematics
- Doctoral advisor: Francis D. Murnaghan

Earl Alexander Coddington (1920–1991) was an American mathematician and professor at the University of California, Los Angeles (UCLA) and an author whose textbook on differential equations, written jointly with Norman Levinson is considered a classic and is used in universities all over the world.

== Life ==
He was born on December 16, 1920, in Washington, DC. From the Johns Hopkins University, he received a PhD in 1948. His dissertation was On the Equations Governing the Stability of the Laminar Boundary Layer in a Compressible Fluid.

He died on November 11, 1991, in Los Angeles, California.

== Career ==
He was a professor of mathematics at UCLA. He came to the department about 1950, as did other professors who helped to build the department into one of the top university mathematics departments. Others who arrived about that time that also helped to build the department were Raymond Redheffer, Ernst Straus, Robert Steinberg, Richard Arens, and Philip Curtis. He was also a leader of the Citizens for California Higher Education the chair of the American Association of University Professors for the campus. He organized against Governor Ronald Reagan's plan to reduce spending to universities and increase tuition.

Coddington was a visiting scholar at Princeton University and taught at the University of Copenhagen and Massachusetts Institute of Technology. He frequently collaborated with Norman Levinson. His textbook on differential equations written with Levinson (colloquially referred to as Coddington–Levinson) is now considered a classic and is used in universities all over the world.

== Bibliography ==
Books

- M. L. Cartwright; E. A. Coddington; H. F. DeBaggis; N. Levinson; J. McCarthy; H. L. Turrittin (1952). S. Lefschetz (ed.). Contributions to the Theory of Nonlinear Oscillations (AM-29). Vol. II. Princeton University Press. JSTOR j.ctt1bgz9z7.1.
- Earl A. Coddington; Norman Levinson (1955). Theory of Ordinary Differential Equations. New York: McGraw-Hill. LCCN 54011260.
- Earl A. Coddington (1961). An Introduction to Ordinary Differential Equations. Englewood Cliffs, N.J.: Prentice-Hall. LCCN 61015333.
- Earl A. Coddington (1973). Extension theory of formally normal and symmetric subspaces. Providence: American Mathematical Society. ISBN 0-8218-1834-1.
- Earl A. Coddington; Hendrik S.V. de Snoo (1981). Regular Boundary Value Problems Associated with Pairs of Ordinary Differential Expressions. Berlin; New York: Springer-Verlag. ISBN 0-387-10706-1.
- Earl A. Coddington; Robert Carlson (1997). Linear Ordinary Differential Equations. Philadelphia: Society for Industrial and Applied Mathematics. ISBN 0-89871-388-9.
