= Structured program theorem =

Theorem about a certain class of control-flow graphs

In programming language theory, the structured program theorem, generally called the Böhm–Jacopini theorem, states that a class of control-flow graphs (historically called flowcharts in this context) can compute any computable function using only the following three control structures to combine subprograms (statements and blocks):

Sequence
Executing one subprogram, and then another subprogram
Selection
Executing one of two subprograms according to the value of a boolean expression
Iteration
Repeatedly executing a subprogram as long as a boolean expression is true

More precise definitions are listed in the next section.

The structured chart subject to these constraints, particularly the loop constraint implying a single exit (as described later in this article), may however use additional variables in the form of bits (stored in an extra integer variable in the original proof) in order to keep track of information that the original program represents by the program location. The construction was based on Böhm's programming language P′′.

The theorem forms the basis of structured programming, a programming paradigm which eschews the goto statement, exclusively using other control semantics for selection and iteration.

The control flows of the structured program theorem—sequence, selection, and repetition—depicted as NS diagrams (blue) and flow charts (green)

== Origin and variants ==
In 1964, Corrado Böhm had defined a simple Turing-complete programming language (P′′), based on sequence and iteration. In a subsequent paper, Böhm and Giuseppe Jacopini restated this result.

The structured program theorem is typically credited to that 1966 paper. Harel wrote in 1980 that the Böhm–Jacopini paper enjoyed "universal popularity", particularly with proponents of structured programming. Harel also noted that "due to its rather technical style [the 1966 Böhm–Jacopini paper] is apparently more often cited than read in detail", and after reviewing a large number of papers published up to 1980, Harel argued that the contents of the Böhm–Jacopini proof were usually misrepresented as a folk theorem that essentially contains a simpler result, a result which itself can be traced to the inception of modern computing theory in the papers of von Neumann and Kleene.

Harel also writes that the more generic name was proposed by H.D. Mills as "The Structure Theorem" in the early 1970s.

The evolution of the theorem was as follows.

=== 1. Böhm 1964 (Program Creation / Computation) ===
Result
Every partial recursive function can be computed by a program using only sequence and iteration.

Notes
This result focuses on program generation. Selection is not required: conditional behavior is encoded by loops. P′′ prevents unstructured control flow through language design, enforcing structure at the source. Böhm restates his results in part 2 of Böhm-Jacopini (1966).

=== 2. Böhm–Jacopini 1966 (Program Transformation) ===
Result
Every flowchart (control-flow graph, CFG) can be transformed into a structured program using only sequence and iteration.
Notes
This version of the theorem focuses on program transformation. It is primarily relevant to compiler optimization, rather than to software design decisions. In part 1 of Böhm–Jacopini (1966), Jacopini proves that any (Note: Böhm–Jacopini did not explicitly require “programs” to be single-entry single-exit, all nodes reachable, but their proof relied on this. Mills (1972, p. 32) made these two requirements explicit.) control-flow graph (CFG) can be rewritten as a structured graph, using only selection, sequence, and iteration, while preserving the original program’s structure. In part 2, Böhm shows that selection is not strictly necessary: any CFG can be transformed using only sequence and iteration.

Jacopini's proof proceeds by induction on the structure of the flow chart. Because it employed pattern matching in graphs, the proof was not really practical as a program transformation algorithm, and thus opened the door for additional research in this direction.

=== 3. Folk Theorem (Loop-Minimal Transformation) ===
Result
Every flowchart is equivalent to a while-program with one occurrence of while-do, provided additional variables are allowed.

Notes
This version of the theorem flattens the Böhm–Jacopini transformation, reducing all iteration to one single loop. Selection is reintroduced for clarity, but is theoretically optional.
The folk theorem replaces the original program's control flow with a single global while loop that simulates a program counter going over all possible labels (flowchart boxes) in the original non-structured program. Harel traced the origin of this folk theorem to two papers marking the beginning of computing. One is the 1946 description of the von Neumann architecture, which explains how a program counter operates in terms of a while loop. Harel notes that the single loop used by the folk version of the structured programming theorem basically just provides operational semantics for the execution of a flowchart on a von Neumann computer. Another, even older source that Harel traced the folk version of the theorem is Stephen Kleene's normal form theorem from 1936.

p := 1
while p > 0 do
    if p = 1 then
        perform step 1 from the flowchart
        p := resulting successor step number of step 1 from the flowchart (0 if no successor)
    end if
    if p = 2 then
        perform step 2 from the flowchart
        p := resulting successor step number of step 2 from the flowchart (0 if no successor)
    end if
    ...
    if p = n then
        perform step n from the flowchart
        p := resulting successor step number of step n from the flowchart (0 if no successor)
    end if
end while

Donald Knuth criticized this form of the proof, which results in pseudocode like the one above, by pointing out that the structure of the original program is completely lost in this transformation. Similarly, Bruce Ian Mills wrote about this approach that "The spirit of block structure is a style, not a language. By simulating a von Neumann machine, we can produce the behavior of any spaghetti code within the confines of a block-structured language. This does not prevent it from being spaghetti."

=== 4. Modern Textbook Statement ===
Structured programming is frequently stated as

Result
Every partial recursive function can be computed by a structured program using (selection, ) sequence and iteration; moreover, with suitable encodings of control state, a single while loop suffices.
Notes
This combines:

1. Böhm (1964) – who proved that for every partial recursive function there exists a (structured) program P′′ which computes it — establishing the existence of an algorithm rather than rewriting an existing one;
2. Böhm–Jacopini (1966) – which shows that any existing program or flowchart can be rewritten using only selection, sequence, and iteration (with selection in fact redundant);
3. The folklore single-loop result, showing that iteration can be reduced to one loop via explicit control-state encoding.

=== 5. Reversible version ===
The Reversible Structured Program Theorem is an important concept in the field of reversible computing. It posits that any computation achievable by a reversible program can also be accomplished through a reversible program using only a structured combination of control-flow constructs such as sequences, selections, and iterations. Any computation achievable by a traditional, irreversible program can also be accomplished through a reversible program, but with the additional constraint that each step must be reversible and some extra output. Furthermore, any reversible unstructured program can also be accomplished through a structured reversible program with only one iteration without any extra output. This theorem lays the foundational principles for constructing reversible algorithms within a structured programming framework.

For the Structured Program Theorem, both local and global methods of proof are known. However, for its reversible version, while a global method of proof is recognized, a local approach similar to that undertaken by Böhm and Jacopini is not yet known. This distinction is an example that underscores the challenges and nuances in establishing the foundations of reversible computing compared to traditional computing paradigms.

== Implications and refinements ==
The Böhm–Jacopini proof did not settle the question of whether to adopt structured programming for software development, partly because the construction was more likely to obscure a program than to improve it. On the contrary, it signaled the beginning of the debate. Edsger Dijkstra's famous letter, Go To Statement Considered Harmful, followed in 1968.

Some academics took a purist approach to the Böhm–Jacopini result and argued that even instructions like break and return from the middle of loops are bad practice as they are not needed in the Böhm–Jacopini proof, and thus they advocated that all loops should have a single exit point. This purist approach is embodied in the Pascal programming language (designed in 1968–1969), which up to the mid-1990s was the preferred tool for teaching introductory programming classes in academia.

Edward Yourdon notes that in the 1970s there was even philosophical opposition to transforming unstructured programs into structured ones by automated means, based on the argument that one needed to think in structured programming fashion from the get go. The pragmatic counterpoint was that such transformations benefited a large body of existing programs. Among the first proposals for an automated transformation was a 1971 paper by Edward Ashcroft and Zohar Manna.

The direct application of the Böhm–Jacopini theorem may result in additional local variables being introduced in the structured chart, and may also result in some code duplication. The latter issue is called the loop-and-a-half problem in this context. Pascal is affected by both of these problems, and according to empirical studies cited by Eric S. Roberts, student programmers had difficulty formulating correct solutions in Pascal for several simple problems, including writing a function for searching an element in an array. A 1980 study by Henry Shapiro cited by Roberts found that using only the Pascal-provided control structures, the correct solution was given by only 20% of the subjects, while no subject wrote incorrect code for this problem if allowed to write a return from the middle of a loop.

In 1973, S. Rao Kosaraju proved that it is possible to avoid adding additional variables in structured programming, as long as arbitrary-depth, multi-level breaks from loops are allowed. (Note: Kosaraju 1973, cited by Knuth 1974.) Furthermore, Kosaraju proved that a strict hierarchy of programs exists, nowadays called the Kosaraju hierarchy, in that for every integer n, there exists a program containing a multi-level break of depth n that cannot be rewritten as program with multi-level breaks of depth less than n (without introducing additional variables). Kosaraju cites the multi-level break construct to the BLISS programming language. The multi-level breaks, in the form a leave label keyword were actually introduced in the BLISS-11 version of that language; the original BLISS only had single-level breaks. The BLISS family of languages didn't provide an unrestricted goto. The Java programming language would later follow this approach as well.

A simpler result from Kosaraju's paper is that a program is reducible to a structured program (without adding variables) if and only if it does not contain a loop with two distinct exits. Reducibility was defined by Kosaraju, loosely speaking, as computing the same function and using the same "primitive actions" and predicates as the original program, but possibly using different control flow structures. (This is a narrower notion of reducibility than what Böhm–Jacopini used.) Inspired by this result, in section VI of his highly-cited paper that introduced the notion of cyclomatic complexity, Thomas J. McCabe described an analogue of Kuratowski's theorem for the control-flow graphs (CFG) of non-structured programs, which is to say, the minimal subgraphs that make the CFG of a program non-structured. These subgraphs have a very good description in natural language. They are:

1. branching out of a loop (other than from the loop cycle test)
2. branching into a loop
3. branching into a decision (i.e. into an if "branch")
4. branching out of a decision

McCabe actually found that these four graphs are not independent when appearing as subgraphs, meaning that a necessary and sufficient condition for a program to be non-structured is for its CFG to have as subgraph one of any subset of three of these four graphs. He also found that if a non-structured program contains one of these four sub-graphs, it must contain another distinct one from the set of four. This latter result helps explain how the control flow of non-structured program becomes entangled in what is popularly called "spaghetti code". McCabe also devised a numerical measure that, given an arbitrary program, quantifies how far off it is from the ideal of being a structured program; McCabe called his measure essential complexity. (Note: The original paper is McCabe 1976. For a secondary exposition see Jorgensen 2002.) McCabe's characterization of the forbidden graphs for structured programming can be considered incomplete, at least if the Dijkstra's D structures are considered the building blocks.

Up to 1990 there were quite a few proposed methods for eliminating gotos from existing programs, while preserving most of their structure. The various approaches to this problem also proposed several notions of equivalence, which are stricter than simply Turing equivalence, in order to avoid output like the folk theorem discussed above. The strictness of the chosen notion of equivalence dictates the minimal set of control flow structures needed. The 1988 JACM paper by Lyle Ramshaw surveys the field up to that point, as well proposing its own method. Ramshaw's algorithm was used for example in some Java decompilers because the Java virtual machine code has branch instructions with targets expressed as offsets, but the high-level Java language only has multi-level break and continue statements. Ammarguellat (1992) proposed a transformation method that goes back to enforcing single-exit.

== Application to COBOL ==
In the 1980s, IBM researcher Harlan Mills oversaw the development of the COBOL Structuring Facility, which applied a structuring algorithm to COBOL code. Mills's transformation involved the following steps for each procedure.

1. Identify the basic blocks in the procedure.
2. Assign a unique label to each block's entry path, and label each block's exit paths with the labels of the entry paths they connect to. Use 0 for return from the procedure and 1 for the procedure's entry path.
3. Break the procedure into its basic blocks.
4. For each block that is the destination of only one exit path, reconnect that block to that exit path.
5. Declare a new variable in the procedure (called L for reference).
6. On each remaining unconnected exit path, add a statement that sets L to the label value on that path.
7. Combine the resulting programs into a selection statement that executes the program with the entry path label indicated by L.
8. Construct a loop that executes this selection statement as long as L is not 0.
9. Construct a sequence that initializes L to 1 and executes the loop.

This construction can be improved by converting some cases of the selection statement into subprocedures.

== See also ==
- Structured programming
- Turing completeness

== Bibliography ==
- Ammarguellat, Z. (1992). "A control-flow normalization algorithm and its complexity". IEEE Transactions on Software Engineering. 18 (3): 237–251. Bibcode:1992ITSEn..18..237A. doi:10.1109/32.126773.
- Ashcroft, Edward; Manna, Zohar (1971). "The translation of go to programs to 'while' programs". Proceedings of IFIP Congress.. Republished in Yourdon 1979, pp. 51–61
- Barendregt, Henk (6 November 2019). "Gems of Corrado Böhm" (PDF). Radboud University Nijmegen.
- Bennett, C. H. (November 1973). "Logical Reversibility of Computation". IBM Journal of Research and Development. 17 (6): 525–532. Bibcode:1973IBMJ...17..525B. doi:10.1147/rd.176.0525.
- Böhm, Corrado (June 1962). "Macchine a indirizzi, dotate di un numero minimo di istruzioni". Rendiconti dell'Accademia Nazionale dei Lincei. Classe di Scienze Fisiche, Matematiche e Naturali, Serie VIII (in Italian). 32: 923–930.
- Böhm, Corrado (1964). "On a family of Turing machines and the related programming language" (PDF). ICC Bulletin. 3: 185–194.
- Böhm, Corrado; Jacopini, Giuseppe [in Italian] (June 1962). "Nuove tecniche di programmazione semplificanti la sintesi di macchine universali di Turing". Rendiconti dell'Accademia Nazionale dei Lincei. Classe di Scienze Fisiche, Matematiche e Naturali, Serie VIII (in Italian). 32: 913–922.
- Böhm, Corrado; Jacopini, Giuseppe [in Italian] (May 1966). "Flow Diagrams, Turing Machines and Languages with Only Two Formation Rules". Communications of the ACM. 9 (5): 366–371. CiteSeerX 10.1.1.119.9119. doi:10.1145/355592.365646. S2CID 10236439.. Republished in Yourdon 1979, pp. 13–25
- Brender, Ronald F. (2002). "The BLISS programming language: a history" (PDF). Software: Practice and Experience. 32 (10): 955–981. doi:10.1002/spe.470. S2CID 45466625.
- Burks, Arthur W.; Goldstine, Herman; von Neumann, John (1947). Preliminary discussion of the Logical Design of an Electronic Computing Instrument (Report). Princeton, NJ: Institute for Advanced Study.
- Cooper, David C. (August 1967). "Böhm and Jacopini's reduction of flow charts". Communications of the ACM. 10 (8): 463. doi:10.1145/363534.363539.
- Dijkstra, Edsger (1968). "Go To Statement Considered Harmful". Communications of the ACM. 11 (3): 147–148. doi:10.1145/362929.362947. S2CID 17469809.. Republished in Yourdon 1979, pp. 29–33
- Greibach, Sheila A. (1975). Greibach, Sheila A. (ed.). Theory of Program Structures: Schemes, Semantics, Verification. Lecture Notes in Computer Science. Vol. 36. Berlin, Heidelberg, New York: Springer-Verlag. doi:10.1007/BFb0023017. ISBN 978-3-540-07415-1. LCCN 75031780.
- Harel, David (1980). "On Folk Theorems". Communications of the ACM. 23 (7): 379–389. doi:10.1145/358886.358892. S2CID 16300625.
- Jorgensen, Paul C. (2002). Software Testing: A Craftsman's Approach (2nd ed.). CRC Press. pp. 150–153. ISBN 978-0-8493-0809-3.
- Knuth, Donald (1974). "Structured Programming with go to Statements". Computing Surveys. 6 (4): 261–301. CiteSeerX 10.1.1.103.6084. doi:10.1145/356635.356640. S2CID 207630080.. Republished in Yourdon 1979, pp. 259–321
- Kosaraju, S. Rao (May 1973). "Analysis of structured programs". Proceedings of the Fifth Annual ACM Symposium on Theory of Computing. ACM. pp. 240–252.,"Analysis of Structured Programs". Journal of Computer and System Sciences. 9 (3): 232–255. 1974 [1973]. doi:10.1016/S0022-0000(74)80043-7.
- Kozen, Dexter; Tseng, Wei-Lung Dustin (2008). "Mathematics of Program Construction – The Böhm–Jacopini Theorem is False, Propositionally" (PDF). MPC 2008. Lecture Notes in Computer Science. Vol. 5133. pp. 177–192. CiteSeerX 10.1.1.218.9241. doi:10.1007/978-3-540-70594-9_11. ISBN 978-3-540-70593-2.
- Louden, Kenneth C.; Lambert, Kenneth A. (2011). Programming Languages: Principles and Practices (3rd ed.). Cengage Learning. ISBN 978-1-111-52941-3.
- Maruyama, Fuyuhiko; Ogawa, Hirotaka; Matsuoka, Satoshi (1999). "An Effective Decompilation Algorithm for Java Bytecodes" (PDF). www.openjit.org (in Japanese).
- McCabe, Thomas J. (December 1976). "A Complexity Measure". IEEE Transactions on Software Engineering. SE-2 (4): 315–318. Bibcode:1976ITSEn...2..308M. doi:10.1109/tse.1976.233837. S2CID 9116234.
- Mills, H. (1972). Mathematical foundations for structured programming (Technical report). Gaithersburg, MD: IBM Federal Systems Division. p. 62.
- Mills, Bruce Ian (2005). Theoretical Introduction to Programming. Springer. p. 279. ISBN 978-1-84628-263-8.
- Nolan, Godfrey (2004). Decompiling Java. Apress. p. 142. ISBN 978-1-4302-0739-9.
- Proebsting, Todd A.; Watterson, Scott A. (1997). "Krakatoa: Decompilation in Java" (PDF). usenix.org.
- Ramshaw, L. (1988). "Eliminating go to's while preserving program structure". Journal of the ACM. 35 (4): 893–920. doi:10.1145/48014.48021. S2CID 31001665.
- Roberts, E. (1995). "Loop Exits and Structured Programming: Reopening the Debate" (PDF). ACM SIGCSE Bulletin. 27 (1): 268–272. doi:10.1145/199691.199815. Archived (PDF) from the original on 25 July 2014.
- University at Buffalo (22 November 2004). "CSE 111, Fall 2004, BOEHM-JACOPINI THEOREM". University at Buffalo. Archived from the original on 22 November 2004.
- Watt, David Anthony; Findlay, William (2004). Programming Language Design Concepts. John Wiley & Sons. ISBN 978-0-470-85320-7.
- Williams, M. H. (1983). "Flowchart Schemata and the Problem of Nomenclature". The Computer Journal. 26 (3): 270–276. doi:10.1093/comjnl/26.3.270.
- Yokoyama, Tetsuo; Axelsen, Holger Bock; Glück, Robert (January 2016). "Fundamentals of reversible flowchart languages". Theoretical Computer Science. 611: 87–115. doi:10.1016/j.tcs.2015.07.046.
- Yourdon, E. N., ed. (1979). Classics in Software Engineering. New York, NY: Yourdon Press. pp. xi, 424. ISBN 978-0-917072-14-7. LCCN 79-63449.
