= Giorgio Ausiello =

Italian computer scientist

- Born: 30 July 1941 (age 85); Dogliani
- Education: University of Rome La Sapienza
- Known for: Algorithms, computational complexity, approximation algorithms for NP-hard optimization problems
- Scientific career
- Fields: Computer science
- Workplaces: University of Rome La Sapienza
- Doctoral advisor: Corrado Böhm

Giorgio Ausiello (born 30 July 1941 in Dogliani) is an Italian computer scientist and professor emeritus at Sapienza University of Rome. He is known for contributions to theoretical computer science, particularly in algorithms, computational complexity, and the theory of approximation algorithms for NP-hard optimization problems.

In 1966 he graduated in physics under the supervision of Corrado Böhm.

From 1966 to 1980 he served as a researcher at the Italian National Research Council (CNR).

In 1980 he became professor of compilers and operating systems at Sapienza University of Rome, and from 1990 he was professor of theoretical computer science in the Department of Computer, Control and Management Engineering.

At Sapienza University he served as chairman of the degree program in computer engineering, director of the graduate school, member of the academic senate, and chairman of the research committee.

In 2012 he was appointed professor emeritus of Sapienza University of Rome.

Throughout his research career Ausiello has worked in several areas of theoretical computer science, including algorithms and computational complexity, approximation algorithms for NP-hard optimization problems, dynamic and online algorithms, and algorithms for graphs and hypergraphs.

Ausiello was among the founders of the European Association for Theoretical Computer Science (EATCS) in 1972 and served as its president from 2006 to 2009.

In 2014 he was named a Fellow of EATCS.

From 2001 to 2015 he served as editor-in-chief of Theoretical Computer Science (Series A).

He was elected a member of Academia Europaea in 1996.

He received an honorary doctorate from Paris-Dauphine University in 2004.

At the international level he served as the Italian national representative on the board of the EU IST research programmes (1988–1994 and 2006–2009) and as a member of the board of trustees of the International Computer Science Institute in Berkeley (1997–2001).

In Italy he participated in several national research initiatives in computer science, including CNR projects on informatics, robotics and information systems.

== Research contributions ==
Ausiello's research has focused on algorithms and computational complexity, particularly on approximation algorithms for NP-hard optimization problems, dynamic and online algorithms, and algorithmic problems on graphs and hypergraphs.

He is co-author of the book Complexity and Approximation: Combinatorial Optimization Problems and their Approximability Properties (1999), which became a standard reference in the study of approximation algorithms and the approximability of NP-hard problems.

== Books ==
- Ausiello, G. Complessità di calcolo delle funzioni. Boringhieri, 1974.
- Ausiello, G.; Marchetti-Spaccamela, A.; Protasi, M. Teoria e progetto di algoritmi fondamentali. Franco Angeli, 1985.
- Ausiello, G.; Crescenzi, P.; Gambosi, G.; Kann, V.; Marchetti-Spaccamela, A.; Protasi, M. Complexity and Approximation: Combinatorial Optimization Problems and their Approximability Properties. Springer, 1999.
- Ausiello, G.; Petreschi, R. The Power of Algorithms. Springer, 2013.
- Ausiello, G.; d'Amore, F.; Gambosi, G.; Laura, L. Linguaggi, Modelli, Complessità. Franco Angeli, 2014.
- Ausiello, G. The Making of a New Science. A personal journey through the early years of theoretical computer science. Springer, 2018.
- Ausiello, G. Algorithms, Monks and Merchants. Computing in Everyday Life in the Middle Ages. World Scientific Pub., 2025

== Selected publications ==
- Ausiello, Giorgio; D'Atri, Alessandro; Saccà, Domenico (1986). "Minimal representation of directed hypergraphs". SIAM Journal on Computing. 15 (2): 418–431. doi:10.1137/0215030.
- Ausiello, Giorgio; D'Atri, Alessandro; Protasi, Marco (1980). "Structure preserving reductions among convex optimization problems". Journal of Computer and System Sciences. 21 (1): 136–153. doi:10.1016/0022-0000(80)90022-4.
- Ausiello, Giorgio; Feuerstein, Esther; Leonardi, Stefano; Stougie, Leen (2001). "Algorithms for the on-line travelling salesman". Algorithmica. 29 (4): 560–581. doi:10.1007/s004530010084.
