= Namioka (surname) =

Namioka (written: 波岡) is a Japanese surname. Notable people with the surname include:

- Isaac Namioka (1928–2019), Japanese-American mathematician
- Lensey Namioka (born 1929), Chinese-born American writer
- Kazuki Namioka (波岡 一喜, born 1978), Japanese actor
