= Gordon Whyburn =

American mathematician

Gordon Thomas Whyburn
- Born: January 7, 1904; Lewisville, Texas
- Died: September 8, 1969 (aged 65); Charlottesville, Virginia
- Known for: Topology
- Awards: Chauvenet Prize (1938)
- Scientific career
- Fields: Mathematician
- Doctoral advisor: R. L. Moore
- Doctoral students: Beatrice Aitchison; Edwin E. Floyd; M. K. Fort, Jr.; John L. Kelley; Alexander Doniphan Wallace

Gordon Thomas Whyburn (January 7, 1904, Lewisville, Texas – September 8, 1969, Charlottesville, Virginia) was an American mathematician who worked on topology.

Whyburn studied at the University of Texas, Austin, where he earned a bachelor's degree in chemistry in 1925. Under the influence of his teacher Robert Lee Moore, Whyburn continued to study at Austin but changed to mathematics and earned a master's degree in mathematics in 1926 and then a PhD in 1927. After two years as an adjunct professor at U. of Texas, with the aid of a Guggenheim fellowship Whyburn spent the academic year 1929/1930 in Vienna with Hans Hahn and in Warsaw with Kuratowski and Sierpinski. After the fellowship expired, Whyburn became a professor at Johns Hopkins University.

From 1934, he was a professor at the University of Virginia, where he modernized the mathematics department and spent the rest of his career. He was chair of the department until his first heart attack in 1966; Edward J. McShane joined the department in 1935, and Gustav A. Hedlund was a member of the department from 1939 to 1948. In the academic year 1952/1953 Whyburn was a visiting professor at Stanford University. In 1953–54, he served as president of the American Mathematical Society.

Whyburn was awarded the Chauvenet Prize in 1938 for his paper "On the Structure of Continua", and was elected a member of the National Academy of Sciences in 1951. His doctoral students include John L. Kelley and Alexander Doniphan Wallace.

His brother William Marvin Whyburn (1901–1972) was a mathematics professor at UCLA and became known for his work on ordinary differential equations.

== Publications ==
- Whyburn, Gordon Thomas (1942), Analytic Topology, American Mathematical Society Colloquium Publications, vol. 28, Providence, R.I.: American Mathematical Society, ISBN 978-0-8218-1028-6, MR 0007095
- Whyburn, Gordon Thomas (1958), Topological analysis, Princeton Mathematical Series, vol. 23, Princeton University Press, ISBN 978-0-691-08054-3, MR 0099642
- Whyburn, Gordon; Duda, Edwin (1979), Dynamic topology, Undergraduate Texts in Mathematics, Berlin, New York: Springer-Verlag, ISBN 978-0-387-90358-3, MR 0526764
