= Robert S. Doran =

American mathematician

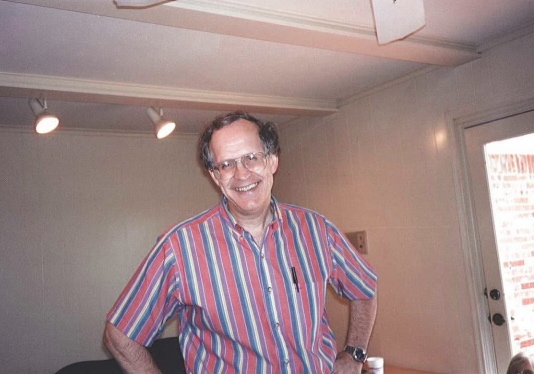
- Born: December 21, 1937 (age 88); Winthrop, Iowa
- Education: University of Iowa; University of Washington
- Scientific career
- Fields: Operator Algebras; Functional Analysis
- Workplaces: Texas Christian University; Massachusetts Institute of Technology; University of Oxford; Institute for Advanced Study
- Doctoral advisors: J. M. G. Fell; Ramesh Gangolli

Robert Stuart Doran (born December 21, 1937) is an American mathematician. He held the John William and Helen Stubbs Potter Professorship in mathematics at Texas Christian University (TCU) from 1995 until his retirement in 2016. Doran served as chair of the TCU mathematics department for 21 years. He has also held visiting appointments at the Massachusetts Institute of Technology, the University of Oxford, and the Institute for Advanced Study in Princeton, N.J. He was elected to the board of trustees of the Association of Members of the Institute for Advanced Study, serving as president of the organization for 10 years. He has been an editor for the Encyclopedia of Mathematics and its Applications, Cambridge University Press, a position he has held since 1988. Doran is known for his research-level books, his award-winning teaching, and for his solution to a long-standing open problem due to Irving Kaplansky on a symmetric *-algebra.

== Personal background ==
Robert Stuart Doran was born on December 21, 1937, in Winthrop, Iowa. In 1959, he married Shirley Ann Lange. They have two sons, Bruce and Brad.

Military service

In 1956, Doran served in the 82nd Airborne Division at Fort Bragg, North Carolina. He served as a Special Forces Instructor at the US Army Jungle Survival Center at Fort Sherman, Colón, Panama. He left active duty in the military in 1958 and he served in the US Army reserves until 1962 when he was honorably discharged.

Educational background

Doran, a member of Phi Beta Kappa, studied mathematics at the University of Iowa from 1959 until 1964, earning a Bachelor's degree and a Master of Science degree. He received a Ph.D in mathematics from the University of Washington in 1968, under the direction of J. M. G. Fell and Ramesh Gangolli. His doctoral dissertation, titled Representations of C*-algebras by Uniform CT-bundles and Operator Theory, dealt with topological representations in spaces of cross-sections of fiber bundles of a non-commutative C*-algebra. This work was motivated in part by the classical Gelfand–Naimark theorem for C*-algebras and by the work of M. Takesaki and J. Tomiyama.

== Professional background ==
Doran held the John William and Helen Stubbs Potter Professor of Mathematics at Texas Christian University from 1995 to 2016. He was faculty sponsor of the TCU chapter of Campus Crusade for Christ (Cru) for 43 years, and he was the founding faculty sponsor in 1989 of the TCU chapter of Brothers Under Christ (Beta Upsilon Chi).

He has held visiting appointments at the Massachusetts Institute of Technology (1980), Oxford University in England (1988), and the Institute for Advanced Study (1981). His areas of research involve representation theory, C*-algebra characterizations, the notion of an approximate identity in a Banach algebra, and Banach bundle theory.

Doran taught at both the undergraduate and graduate levels. In 1988 he published an article titled "A care package for undergraduate mathematics students" that outlined his teaching methods. He has received national, statewide, and local awards for his teaching.

Doran was chair of the TCU Mathematics Department for 21 years (1990–2011). In 1986 he was elected to the board of trustees the Association of Members of the Institute for Advanced Study. He was president of the association for 10 years (1990-1999). Doran has been an editor for Cambridge University Press since 1988. He has also organized many American Mathematical Society special sessions and conferences for CBMS, the Conference Board of the Mathematical Sciences. His first such conference was held at TCU in 1970 with Paul Halmos as principal speaker. The most recent conference was held at TCU, June 2011 with Phillip Griffiths, former Director of the Institute for Advanced Study as principal speaker.

Doran is known for his elegant solution of a long-standing unsolved problem on a symmetric *-algebra left open by Irving Kaplansky in the Duke Mathematical Journal in 1949.

== Published works ==
Doran has published books, articles, and reviews on a variety of topics, often collaborating with other mathematicians, including J. M. G. Fell, Richard Kadison, Calvin Moore, Jonathan Rosenberg, Paul Sally, Robert Zimmer, and V. S. Varadarajan.

Books

- Approximate identities and factorization in Banach modules, vol. 768, (with J. Wichmann), Springer-Verlag, Berlin Heidelberg New York 1979. ISBN 3-540-09725-2
- Characterization of C*-algebras: The Gelfand–Naimark Theorems, vol. 101, (with V. Belfi), Marcel-Dekker, 1986. ISBN 0-8247-7569-4
- Representations of *-algebras, locally compact groups, and Banach *-algebraic bundles, 125, vol. I, (with J. M. G. Fell), Academic Press, 1988. ISBN 0-12-252721-6
- Representations of *-algebras, locally compact groups, and Banach *-algebraic bundles, 126, vol. II, (with J. M. G. Fell), Academic Press, 1988. ISBN 0-12-252722-4
- Self-adjoint and non-self-adjoint operator algebras and operator theory, (ed.) vol. 120, Contemporary Mathematics, American Mathematical Society, 1990. ISBN 0-8218-5127-6
- C*-algebras: 1943–1993 (A fifty year celebration), (ed.) vol. 120, Contemporary Mathematics, American Mathematical Society, 1994. ISBN 0-8218-5175-6
- Automorphic forms, automorphjic representations and arithmetic. I. (ed. with Z. Dou and G. Gilbert), 66, vol. 1, Symposia for Pure Mathematics, American Mathematical Society, 1999. ISBN 0-8218-1050-2
- Automorphic forms, automorphjic representations and arithmetic. II. (ed. with Z. Dou and G. Gilbert), 66, vol. 2, Symposia forPure Mathematics, American Mathematical Society, 1999. ISBN 0-8218-1051-0
- The mathematical legacy of Harish-Chandra: A celebration of representation theory and harmonic analysis, (ed. with V. S. Varadarajan), vol. 68, Symposia for Pure Mathematics, American Mathematical Society, 2000. ISBN 0-8218-1197-5
- Operator algebras, quantization, and non-commutative geometry, (ed. with R. V. Kadison), vol. 365, Contemporary Mathematics, American Mathematical Society, 2004. ISBN 0-8218-3402-9
- Group representations, ergodic theory and mathematical physics, (ed. with C. C. Moore and R. J. Zimmer), vol. 449, Contemporary Mathematics, American Mathematical Society, 2008. ISBN 978-0-8218-4225-6
- Superstrings, geometry, topology, and C*-algebras, (ed. with G. Friedman and J. Rosenberg), vol. 81, Symposia for Pure Mathematics, American Mathematical Society, 2010. ISBN 978-0-8218-4887-6
- Harmonic analysis and reductive p-adic groups, (ed. with P. J. Sally and L. Spice), vol. 543, Contemporary Mathematics, American Mathematical Society, 2011. ISBN 978-0-8218-4985-9
- Hodge theory, complex geometry, and representation theory, (ed. with G. Friedman and S. Nollet), vol. 608, Contemporary Mathematics, American Mathematical Society in 2014. ISBN 978-0-8218-9415-6
- Operator algebras and their applications: A tribute to Richard V. Kadison, (ed. with E. Park), vol. 671, Contemporary Mathematics, American Mathematical Society, 2016. ISBN 978-1-4704-1948-6

In addition to research articles and books, Doran has published over 550 reviews for the Mathematical Reviews.

== Honors and awards ==
- 1989 National CASE-Carnegie Gold Medalist for outstanding teaching (awarded by CASE, the Council for Advancement and Support of Education based in Washington DC).
- 1989 CASE-Carnegie Texas Professor of the Year (awarded by CASE)
- 1992 Texas MAA Professor of the Year (awarded by MAA, the Mathematical Association of America).
- 1993 TCU Honors Professor of the Year (awarded by the TCU Honors College)
- 1989 Piper Professor (Texas statewide award; given by the Minnie Stevens Piper Foundation, San Antonio, Texas)
- 1988 Chancellor's Award at TCU for Distinguished Teaching, the top faculty honor at TCU
- 1986 Burlington Northern Faculty Achievement Award, awarded by the Burlington Northern Corporation
