= M. K. Fort Jr. =

American mathematician

Marion Kirkland "Kirk" Fort Jr. (1921–1964) was an American mathematician, specializing in general topology. The topological spaces called Fort space and Arens–Fort space are named after him.

Fort was born in 1921 in Spartanburg, South Carolina, where he graduated with an A.B. from Wofford College in 1941. He received an M.A. in 1944 from the University of Virginia, where he also received his Ph.D. in 1948, advised by Gordon Thomas Whyburn. He was at the University of Illinois from then until 1953, when he came to the University of Georgia (UGA). He later served as head of the UGA mathematics department, 1959–1963. In 1963 Fort became the first holder of the university's David C. Barrow Chair of Mathematics. He died in 1964 during a leave of absence at the Institute for Defense Analyses in Princeton, New Jersey.
