= William Whyburn =

American mathematician (1901–1972)

4th President of Texas Tech University
- In office 1944–1948
- Preceded by: Clifford B. Jones
- Succeeded by: Dossie M. Wiggins

Personal details
- Born: 12 November 1901 Lewisville, Texas
- Died: 5 May 1972 (aged 70) Greenville, North Carolina
- Resting place: Chinn's Chapel Cemetery, Copper Canyon, Denton County, Texas, US
- Spouse: Marie Barfield
- Children: Willa Whyburn, Clifton Whyburn
- Education: University of Texas at Austin, (B.A., M.A., Ph.D.)

William Marvin Whyburn (12 November 1901 – 5 May 1972) was an American mathematician who worked on ordinary differential equations. His work focussed on a multitude of topics including, boundary value problems, properties of Green’s function and properties of Green’s matrix.

== Biography ==
=== Early life ===
William Marvin Whyburn was born in Lewisville, Texas, on 12 November 1901. He was the son of farmers Thomas Whyburn and Eugenia Elizabeth McLeod. He had a brother Gordon Whyburn, also a mathematician who primarily studied topology. He attended Bethel School where he would study until he was 14, when he sat an entrance exam and was accepted into North Texas State College in 1916.

=== Undergraduate education ===
Whyburn studied for four years at North Texas State College, where after he would study mathematics at the University of Texas. He attained his Bachelor of Arts degree in 1922 and went on to achieve a Master of Arts degree in mathematics the following year.

In 1923 Whyburn married Marie Barfield. Marie was also a student at the University of Texas. Together they had two children, Willa Whyburn and Clifton Whyburn. Clifton also studied mathematics.

=== Undergraduate teaching ===
While studying at North Texas State College (1918–1920) Whyburn taught at different schools in Denton County. One of the students taught by Whyburn was famous mathematician Samuel S. Wilks. In 1923/24 Whyburn taught full-time at South Park Junior College, Beaumont then he held an assistant professor role at Texas A&M College the years after. Again in 1925/26 Whyburn was an associate professor at the Texas Technological College in Lubbock, Texas. Whyburn was given the Louis Lipsitz fellowship for the academic year 1926/27, which allowed him to study full-time.

=== Postgraduate career ===
Whyburn continued to study at the University of Texas for his Ph.D. under the supervision of his advisor Hyman Joseph Ettlinger. After the publication of his thesis Linear Boundary Value Problems for Ordinary Differential Equations and Their Associated Difference Equations he was awarded his doctorate in June 1927. Additionally, in the three years before this publication Whyburn published three other papers, two of which were on Green’s function. Whyburn published two more papers in 1927 before spending the 1927/28 academic year at Harvard university as a National Research Fellow.

Whyburn was assigned as an Assistant Professor of Mathematics at the University of California, Los Angeles in 1928. Ten years later Whyburn was made a full professor in 1938 as well as being the chairman for the Mathematics Department for a seven-year tenure beginning in 1937.

Whyburn was the chairman of the supervisors committee for Engineering, Science, Management War Training Programs during the second world war. Throughout the war he wrote a paper and a book about mathematics as its applied in war. Whyburn was given the role of president of the Texas Technological College in 1944. In this role he would help improve the educational profile of the school to other major educational bodies such as the American Association of Universities and American Association of University Women. As a result of his work, the college gained recognition from governmental agencies, reflecting his presidential impact.

In 1948 Whyburn resigned from his position at the Texas Technological College as he was appointed Kenan Professor of Mathematics at the University of North Carolina at Chapel Hill, where he would further be appointed as chairman of the Mathematics department. After serving three years as Vice President for research from 1957-1960, Whyburn retired in 1967. He was then appointed as the Frensley Professor of Mathematics at the Southern Methodist University in Dallas. Whyburn retired from this position in 1970 before working a part-time teaching position at East Carolina University, North Carolina.

As a teacher Whyburn was focussed on the students perception and put them first. He would be methodical in how he approached different students and their areas of postgraduate research whilst supervising. He supervised the Ph.D. of the following students: Leonard P. Burton, Albert Deal, Bertram Drucker, Garett Etgen, Paul Herwitz, Sandra Hilt, A. Keith Hinds, Nathaniel Macon, Edward J. Pellicciaro, Tullio Pignani, Clay Campbell Ross, David Showalter and Frank Stellard.

Whyburn died of a heart attack on 5 May 1972 in Greenville, North Carolina. He is buried in Chinn's Chapel Cemetery, Copper Canyon, Texas

== Selected publications ==
- "An Extension of the Definition of the Green's Function in One Dimension"(1924)
- "Second-Order Differential Systems With Integral and k-Point Boundary Conditions" (1928)
- "Functional Properties of the Solutions of Differential Systems" (1930)
- "Differential Equations with General Boundary Conditions" (1942)
- "A Nonlinear Boundary Value Problem For Second Order Differential Systems" (1955)
- "Complexes of Differential Systems" (1972)
