= Arens–Fort space =

Topological space

Example neighborhood of (0,0) in the Arens–Fort space

In mathematics, the Arens–Fort space is a special example in the theory of topological spaces, named for Richard Friederich Arens and M. K. Fort, Jr.

== Definition ==
The Arens–Fort space is the topological space $(X,\tau)$ where $X$ is the set of ordered pairs of non-negative integers $(m, n).$ A subset $U \subseteq X$ is open, that is, belongs to $\tau,$ if and only if:

- $U$ does not contain $(0, 0),$ or
- $U$ contains $(0, 0)$ and also all but a finite number of points of all but a finite number of columns, where a column is a set $\{ (m, n) ~:~ 0 \leq n \in \mathbb{Z} \}$ with $0 \leq m \in \mathbb{Z}$ fixed.

In other words, an open set is only "allowed" to contain $(0, 0)$ if only a finite number of its columns contain significant gaps, where a gap in a column is significant if it omits an infinite number of points.

== Properties ==
It is

- Hausdorff
- regular
- normal

It is not:

- second-countable
- first-countable
- metrizable
- compact
- sequential
- Fréchet–Urysohn

There is no sequence in $X \setminus \{ (0, 0) \}$ that converges to $(0, 0).$ However, there is a sequence $x_{\bull} = \left( x_i \right)_{i=1}^{\infty}$ in $X \setminus \{ (0, 0) \}$ such that $(0, 0)$ is a cluster point of $x_{\bull}.$

== See also ==
- Fort space – Examples of topological spaces
- List of topologies – List of concrete topologies and topological spaces
