= Corrado Böhm =

Italian computer scientist (1923–2017)

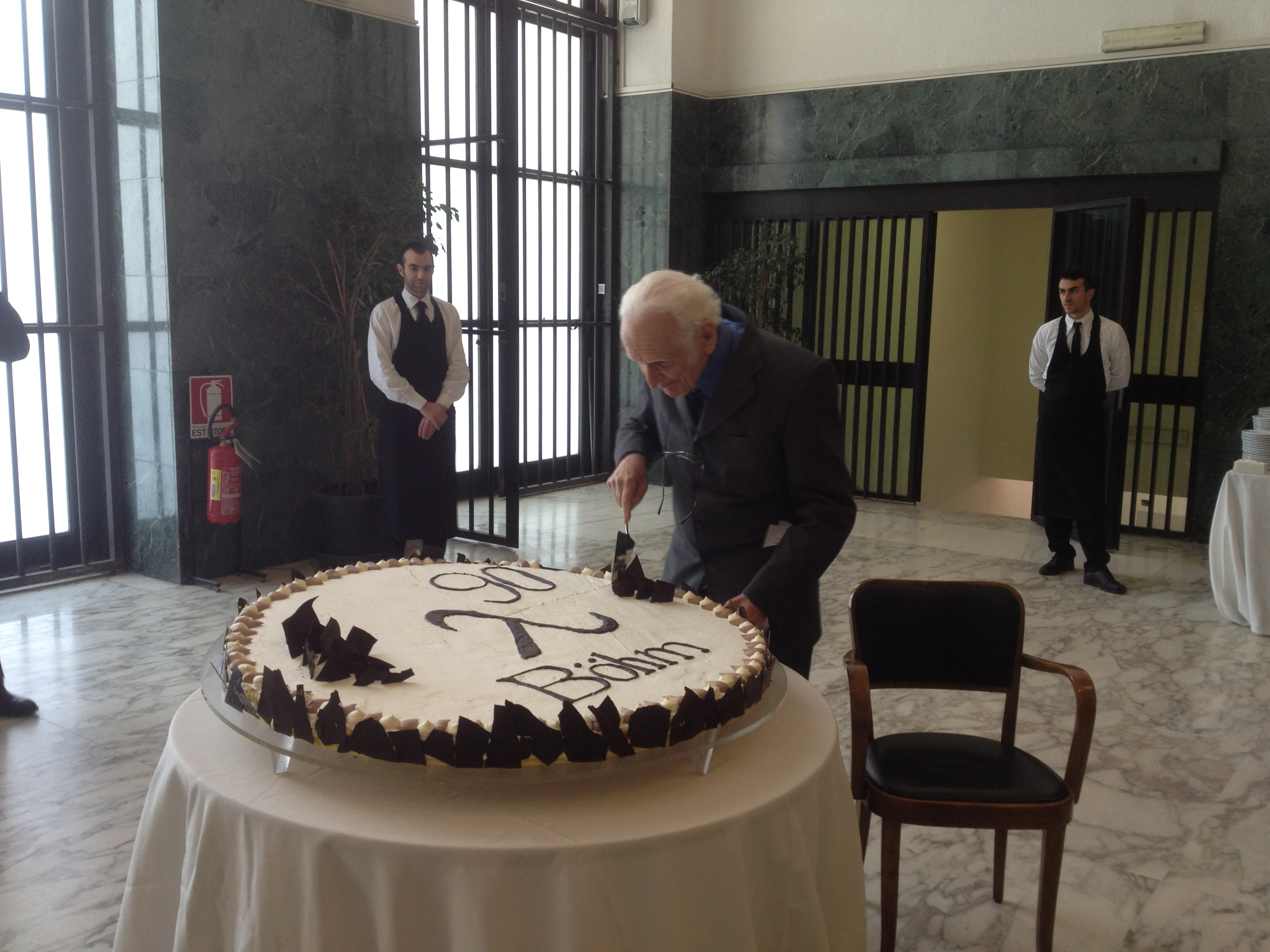
- Corrado Böhm's 90th birthday celebration at ETAPS 2013 in Rome, Italy
- Born: 17 January 1923; Milan
- Died: 23 October 2017 (aged 94); Rome
- Education: ETH Zürich
- Scientific career
- Fields: Computer science
- Workplaces: University of Rome "La Sapienza"
- Doctoral advisor: Eduard Stiefel; Paul Bernays
- Doctoral students: Giorgio Ausiello; Mariangiola Dezani-Ciancaglini

Corrado Böhm (17 January 1923 – 23 October 2017) was an Italian computer scientist and Professor Emeritus at the University of Rome "La Sapienza", known especially for his contributions to the theory of structured programming, constructive mathematics, combinatory logic, lambda calculus, and the semantics and implementation of functional programming languages.

== Work ==
In his PhD dissertation (in Mathematics, at ETH Zurich, 1951; published in 1954), Böhm describes for the first time a full meta-circular compiler, that is a translation mechanism of a programming language, written in that same language. His most influential contribution is the so-called structured program theorem, published in 1966 together with Giuseppe Jacopini. Together with Alessandro Berarducci, he demonstrated an isomorphism between the strictly-positive algebraic data types and the polymorphic lambda-terms, otherwise known as Böhm–Berarducci encoding.

In the lambda calculus, he established an important separation theorem between normal forms, known as Böhm's theorem, which states that for every two closed λ-terms T_{1} and T_{2} which have different βη-normal forms, there exists a term Δ where Δ T_{1} and Δ T_{2} evaluate to different free variables (i.e., they may be taken apart internally). This means that, for normalizing terms, Morris' contextual equivalence, which is a semantic property, may be decided through equality of normal forms, a syntactic property, as it coincides with βη-equality.

A special issue of Theoretical Computer Science was dedicated to him in 1993, on his 70th birthday. He is the recipient of the 2001 EATCS Award for a distinguished career in theoretical computer science.

== Selected publications ==
- Böhm, Corrado (1954). "Calculatrices digitales. Du déchiffrage des formules mathématiques par la machine même dans la conception du programme" (PDF). Annali di Mat. pura e applicata. serie IV (tomo XXXVII): 1–51. "Böhm: Digital computers. On encoding logical-mathematical formulas using the machine itself during program conception". Translated by Sestoft, B. 4 May 2016.
- — (1964). "On a family of Turing machines and the related programming language". ICC bulletin. 3: 185–194. doi:10.2307/2270680.: Introduced P′′, the first imperative language without GOTO to be proved Turing-complete.
- —; Jacopini, Giuseppe [in Italian] (May 1966). "Flow Diagrams, Turing Machines and Languages with Only Two Formation Rules". Communications of the ACM. 9 (5): 366–371. doi:10.1145/355592.365646. S2CID 10236439.
- — (1968). "Alcune proprietà delle forme β-η-normali nel λ-K-calcolo". Pubbl. INAC (in Italian). 696. Roma.
- —; Berarducci, A. (1985). "Automatic Synthesis of typed Lambda-programs on Term Algebras". Theoretical Computer Science. 39: 135–154. doi:10.1016/0304-3975(85)90135-5.
- — (1988). "Functional Programming and Combinatory Algebras". In Chytil, M.P.; Janiga, L.; Koubek, V. (eds.). MFCS. LNCS 324. Carlsbad, Czechoslovakia. pp. 14–26.

== See also ==
- P′′, a minimal computer programming language
- Structured program theorem
- List of pioneers in computer science
- Böhm tree
- Böhm's theorem
