= Böhm's language =

Computer programming language

Böhm's language refers to the language, machine and a translation method developed by Corrado Böhm during the latter part of 1950. Böhm used this work as part of his dissertation, submitted in 1951 (amended after submission), published in 1954.

== The compiler ==
Böhm's work described the first complete meta-circular compiler. The code for the compiler was remarkably concise, and consisted of only 114 lines of code. Since the language accepted only two kinds of expressions: fully parenthesized or without parenthesis, but with operator precedence, therefore the code of the compiler split into two parts. 59 lines were used to handle formulas with parenthesis, 51 to handle operator precedence expressions and 4 to decide between those two cases.

Böhm's parsing technique for expressions had only linear complexity. It generated instructions to a structure similar to a binary tree.

== The language ==
Böhm's language consisted of only assignment operations. It had no special constructs like user defined functions, control structures. Variables represented only non-negative integers. To perform a jump one had to write to a special π variable. To perform I/O ? symbol was used.

An example program which loads 11-element array from an input would look as follows.

A. Set i = 0 (plus the                                π → G
   base address 100 for                             100 → i
   the input array a).                                B → π

B. Let a new input a[i] be                           π' → B
   given. Increase i by unity,                        ? → ↓i
   and stop if i > 10,                              i+1 → i
   otherwise repeat B.  [(1∩(i∸110))∙Ω]+[(1∸(i∸110))∙B] → π

∩ represents a minimum operator and ∸ logical difference.

== Sources ==
- Knuth, Donald E.; Pardo, Luis Trabb (1976). "Early development of programming languages". Stanford University, Computer Science Department.
