= Namioka's theorem =

In functional analysis, Namioka's theorem is a result concerning the relationship between separate continuity and joint continuity of functions defined on product spaces. Named after mathematician Isaac Namioka, who proved it in his 1974 paper Separate Continuity and Joint Continuity published in the Pacific Journal of Mathematics, the theorem establishes conditions under which a separately continuous function must be jointly continuous on a topologically large subset of its domain.

== Statement ==
Namioka's theorem. Let $X$ be a Čech-complete topological space (such as a complete metric space), $Y$ be a compact Hausdorff space, and $Z$ be a metric space. If $f: X \times Y \rightarrow Z$ is separately continuous, meaning that

- for each fixed $x_0 \in X$, the function $y \mapsto f(x_0, y)$ is continuous on $Y$, and
- for each fixed $y_0 \in Y$, the function $x \mapsto f(x, y_0)$ is continuous on $X$,

then there exists a dense $G_\delta$-subset $G$ of $X$ such that $f$ is jointly continuous at each point of $G \times Y$.

Namioka's theorem can be equivalently stated in terms of the set $C(f)$ of points where $f$ is continuous, stating that the projection of $C(f)$ onto $X$ contains a dense $G_\delta$ subset of $X$.

== History ==
French mathematician René Baire was among the first to systematically study the relationship between separate and joint continuity in 1899, for real-valued functions of real variables. Austrian mathematician Hans Hahn later extended these investigations in 1932, proving similar results for functions defined on complete metric spaces. Namioka generalized these results to non-metrizable spaces, particularly to Čech-complete spaces, which include all complete metric spaces as a special case. There exists a proof using tools from general topology such as the Arkhangel'skii–Frolík covering theorem and the Kuratowski and Ryll-Nardzewski measurable selection theorem.

== See also ==
- Baire space
- Stone–Čech compactification
