= James Michael Gardner Fell =

Canadian-American mathematician

James Michael Gardner Fell (4 December 1923, Vancouver – 16 December 2016, Gladwyne, Pennsylvania) was a Canadian-American mathematician, specializing in functional analysis and representation theory. He is known for Fell bundles (i.e. Banach *-algebraic bundles). He was an accomplished linguist who knew Sanskrit, Icelandic, German, French, Russian, Greek, and Latin.

== Biography ==
J. M. G. Fell's father was James Pemberton Fell, a colonel in the Canadian Army Corps of Engineers and a real estate developer who helped to lay out the streets of North Vancouver. J. M. G. Fell attended elementary school in Vancouver and then in 1935 went to England for secondary school at Eton. In 1940 he returned to Canada and matriculated at the University of British Columbia, graduating there in 1943 at the age of 19. In 1951 he received his Ph.D. in mathematics from the University of California, Berkeley under John L. Kelley with thesis On L-spaces.

He was an assistant professor at California Institute of Technology from 1953 to 1955, a research associate at the University of Chicago from 1955 to 1956, and an assistant professor, then associate professor, and then full professor at the University of Washington from 1956 to 1965. He was a full professor from 1965 to 1991 at the University of Pennsylvania, where he retired as professor emeritus.

On 4 July 1957 Fell married Angela Daphne Rachel MacDonald.

During his years at Penn he developed a great interest in the Sanskrit language, and attended Sanskrit courses in the South Asian Studies Department. After retirement his passion for languages extended to Icelandic, which he learned to speak, and in his retirement he published six books, most of them translations, on aspects of Icelandic Christianity. He and Daphne spent at least three months a year in Reykjavik every year for twenty years.

He was an Invited Speaker at the ICM in 1970 in Nice. He gave a mathematical lecture at the University of Iceland, and in 2000 the University gave him an honorary doctorate in theology.

Upon his death he was survived by his wife, two children, and a grandson.

== Fell bundles ==
In a sense, it has long been understood that Fell bundles provide an important mechanism for illuminating the structure of C*-dynamical systems and their associated crossed products. Fell invented Fell bundles precisely to understand better and extend the theory of induced representations that had been built up around Mackey's program ...

== Selected publications ==
- Fell, J. M. G. (1960). "The dual spaces of C*-algebras". Transactions of the American Mathematical Society. 94 (3): 365. doi:10.1090/S0002-9947-1960-0146681-0.
- Fell, J. M. G. (1961). "The structure of algebras of operator fields". Acta Mathematica. 106 (3–4): 233–280. doi:10.1007/BF02545788.
- Fell, J. M. G. (1962). "A Hausdorff Topology for the Closed Subsets of a Locally Compact Non-Hausdorff Space". Proceedings of the American Mathematical Society. 13 (3): 472–476. doi:10.2307/2034964. JSTOR 2034964.
- Fell, J. M. G. (1962). "A new proof that nilpotent groups are CCR". Proceedings of the American Mathematical Society. 13 (1): 93. doi:10.1090/S0002-9939-1962-0133404-1.
- Fell, J. M. G. (1964). "Weak containment and induced representations of groups. II". Transactions of the American Mathematical Society. 110 (3): 424–447. doi:10.1090/S0002-9947-1964-0159898-X.
- Fell, J. M. G. (1965). "The dual spaces of Banach algebras". Transactions of the American Mathematical Society. 114 (1): 227. doi:10.1090/S0002-9947-1965-0172131-9.
- Fell, J. M. G. (1967). "Conjugating representations and related results on semi-simple Lie groups". Transactions of the American Mathematical Society. 127 (3): 405–426. doi:10.1090/S0002-9947-1967-0209401-3.
- Fell, J. M. G. (1969). An extension of Mackey's method to Banach *-algebraic bundles. Memoirs of the American Mathematical Society. Vol. 90. American Mathematical Society. ISBN 0-821-81290-4.
- Fell, J. M. G.; Doran, R. S. (1988). Representations of*-algebras, Locally Compact Groups, and Banach*-algebraic Bundles: Basic representation theory of groups and algebras. Vol. 1. Academic Press. ISBN 9780080874449.
- Fell, J. M. G. (2006). Induced representations and Banach *-algebraic bundles. Lecture Notes in Mathematics. Vol. 582. Springer. ISBN 9783540699774.
