= Vashishtha Narayan Singh =

Indian academic (1946–2019)

- Born: 2 April 1946; Basantpur, Bhojpur District, British India
- Died: 14 November 2019 (aged 73); Patna, Bihar, India
- Occupation: Academic
- Awards: Padma Shri (2020)

Academic background
- Education: Netarhat Awasiya Vidyalaya; Patna Science College; University of California, Berkeley
- Doctoral advisor: John L. Kelley

Academic work
- Institutions: University of Washington; IIT Kanpur; TIFR, Mumbai; I.S.I. Kolkata

Vashishtha Narayan Singh (2 April 1946 – 14 November 2019) was an Indian mathematician and academic. He taught mathematics at various institutes in India between the 1960s and the 1970s. He is popular on social media for supposedly having challenged Einstein's Theory of Relativity but there are no credible sources that prove so. In the early 1970s, Singh was diagnosed with schizophrenia due to which he was repeatedly in and out of psychiatric hospitals and only returned to academia in 2014. He was posthumously awarded the Padma Shri, the fourth highest civilian award of India for his contributions, in 2020.

== Early life and career ==
Singh was born on 2 April 1946 to Lal Bahadur Singh, a police constable, and Lahaso Devi in the Basantpur village of the Bhojpur district in Bihar, India in a Lohtamia Rajput family.

Singh was a child prodigy. He received his primary and secondary education from Netarhat Awasiya Vidyalaya, and he received his college education from Patna Science College. He received recognition as a student when he was allowed by Patna University to appear for examination in the first year of its three-year BSc (Hons.) Mathematics course and later MSc examination the next year.

Singh joined the University of California, Berkeley in 1965 and received a PhD in Reproducing Kernels and Operators with a Cyclic Vector (Cycle Vector Space Theory) in 1969 under doctoral advisor John L. Kelley.

After receiving his PhD, Singh joined the University of Washington as an assistant professor. He returned to India in 1974 to teach at Indian Institute of Technology Kanpur. After eight months, he joined Tata Institute of Fundamental Research (TIFR), Bombay where he worked on a short-term position. Later he was appointed a faculty at the Indian Statistical Institute, Kolkata.

== Later life ==
Singh married Vandana Rani Singh in 1973 and they divorced in 1976. He was later diagnosed with schizophrenia. With his condition worsening in the late 1970s, he was admitted to the Central Institute of Psychiatry in Kanke (now in Jharkhand) and remained there until 1985.

In 1987, Singh returned to his village of Basantpur. He disappeared during his train journey to Pune in 1989 and was found four years later in 1993 in Doriganj near Chhapra of Saran district. He was then admitted to the National Institute of Mental Health and Neurosciences (NIMHANS), Bangalore. In 2002, he was treated at the Institute of Human Behaviour and Allied Sciences (IHBAS), Delhi.

In 2014, Singh was appointed a visiting professor at Bhupendra Narayan Mandal University (BNMU) in Madhepura.

Singh died on 14 November 2019 at Patna Medical College and Hospital in Patna after prolonged illness.

== Awards ==
Singh was awarded the Padma Shri, the fourth highest civilian award of India, posthumously in 2020.

== In popular culture ==
Filmmaker Prakash Jha announced a biographical film on Singh's life in 2018. Singh's brother Ayodhya Prasad Singh, citing pending legal guardianship issues, said that no film rights had been granted.

== Publication ==
- Singh, Vashishtha N. (1974). "Reproducing kernels and operators with a cyclic vector. I." Pacific Journal of Mathematics. 52 (2): 567–584. doi:10.2140/pjm.1974.52.567. ISSN 0030-8730.
