= John L. Kelley =

American mathematician

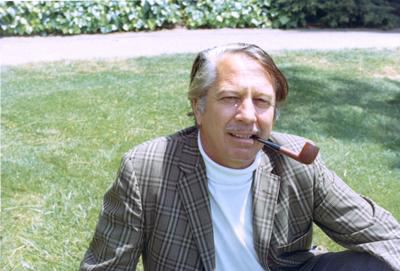
- John Kelley at Berkeley in 1968
- Born: December 6, 1916; Kansas, U.S.
- Died: November 26, 1999 (aged 82)
- Education: University of California, Los Angeles (BA, MA), University of Virginia (PhD)
- Known for: Coin of the term net
- Scientific career
- Fields: Mathematics (general topology and functional analysis)
- Workplaces: University of California, Berkeley; Tulane University; University of Kansas
- Thesis: A Study of Hyperspaces (1940)
- Doctoral advisor: Gordon Thomas Whyburn
- Doctoral students: Vashishtha Narayan Singh, James Michael Gardner Fell, Isaac Namioka, and Reese Prosser

John L. Kelley (December 6, 1916, in Kansas – November 26, 1999, in Berkeley, California) was an American mathematician at the University of California, Berkeley, who worked in general topology and functional analysis.

Kelley's 1955 text, General Topology, which eventually appeared in three editions and several translations, is a classic and widely cited graduate-level introduction to topology. The appendix sets out a new approach to axiomatic set theory, now called Morse–Kelley set theory, that builds on Von Neumann–Bernays–Gödel set theory. He introduced the first definition of a subnet.

After earning B.A. (1936) and M.A. (1937) degrees from the University of California, Los Angeles, he went to the University of Virginia, where he obtained his Ph.D. in 1940. Gordon Whyburn, a student of Robert Lee Moore, supervised his thesis A Study of Hyperspaces. He taught at the University of Notre Dame until the outbreak of World War II. From 1942 to 1945, he did mathematics (mainly exterior ballistics, including ballistics for the atomic bomb) for the war effort at the Aberdeen Proving Ground, where his work unit included his future Berkeley colleagues Anthony Morse and Charles Morrey. After teaching at the University of Chicago, 1946–47, Kelley spent most of his career at Berkeley, from which he retired in 1985. He chaired the Mathematics Department at Berkeley 1957–60 and 1975–80. He held visiting appointments at Cambridge University and the Indian Institute of Technology in Kanpur, India. An Indian mathematician, Vashishtha Narayan Singh, was among those mentored by Kelley.

In 1950, Kelley was one of 29 tenured Berkeley faculty (3 of whom were members of the Mathematics Department) dismissed for refusing to sign a McCarthy-era loyalty oath mandated by the UC Board of Regents. When asked why he refused to swear that he was loyal to his country, he replied, "For the same reason that I would refuse to swear, under duress, that I loved my mother." He then taught at Tulane University and the University of Kansas. He returned to Berkeley in 1953, after the California Supreme Court declared the oath unconstitutional and directed UC Berkeley to rehire the dismissed academics. He was later an outspoken opponent of the Vietnam War.

Kelley's interest in teaching extended well beyond the higher reaches of mathematics. In 1960, he took a leave of absence to serve as the National Teacher on NBC's Continental Classroom television program. He was an active member of the School Mathematics Study Group (SMSG), which played an important role in designing and promulgating the "new math" of that era. In 1964, he led his department to introduce a new major called Mathematics for Teachers, and later taught one of its core courses. These endeavors culminated in the text Kelley and Richert (1970). In 1977–78, he was a member of the U.S. Commission on Mathematical Instruction.

His doctoral students include Vashishtha Narayan Singh, James Michael Gardner Fell, Isaac Namioka, and Reese Prosser.

== Books by Kelley ==
- 1953 (with Edward J. McShane and Franklin V. Reno). Exterior Ballistics. The University of Denver Press.
- 1955. General Topology. David Van Nostrand Company, link from Internet Archive. Reprinted (1975) by Springer Verlag. ISBN 0-387-90125-6
- 1960 (with Roy Dubisch and Scott Taylor). Introduction to Modern Algebra. Van Nostrand.
- 1963 (with Isaac Namioka et al.). Linear Topological Spaces. Van Nostrand.
- 1970 (with Donald Richert). Elementary Mathematics for Teachers.
- 1988 (with T. P. Srinivasan). Measure and Integral, Volume 1, Springer-Verlag.
