= Richard Friederich Arens =

American mathematician (1919–2000)

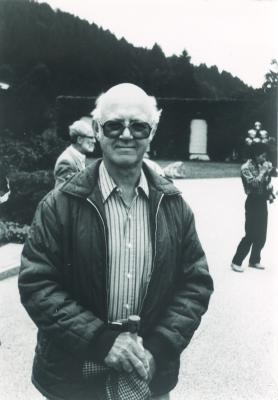
- Born: 24 April 1919; Iserlohn, Germany
- Died: 3 May 2000 (aged 81); Los Angeles, United States
- Education: Harvard University; University of California, Los Angeles
- Awards: Putnam Fellow (1941)
- Scientific career
- Fields: Mathematics
- Workplaces: University of California, Los Angeles

Richard Friederich Arens (24 April 1919 – 3 May 2000) was an American mathematician. He was born in Iserlohn, Germany. He emigrated to the United States in 1925.

Arens received his Ph.D. in 1945 from Harvard University. He was several times a visiting scholar at the Institute for Advanced Study (1945–46, 1946–47, and 1953–54). He was an Invited Speaker at the ICM in 1950 in Cambridge, Massachusetts.

Arens worked in functional analysis, and was a professor at UCLA for more than 40 years. He served on the editorial board of the Pacific Journal of Mathematics for 14 years 1965–1979. There are three topological spaces named for Arens in the book Counterexamples in Topology, including Arens–Fort space.

Arens died in Los Angeles, California.

== See also ==
- Arens square
- Mackey–Arens theorem
