= Isaac Namioka =

Japanese-American mathematician (1928–2019)

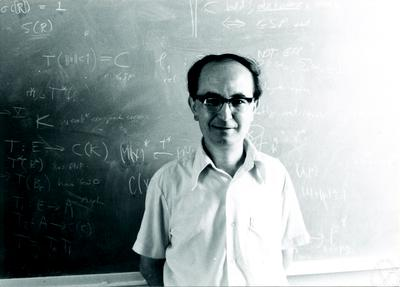
Isaac Namioka

Isaac Namioka (April 25, 1928 – September 25, 2019) was a Japanese-American mathematician who worked in general topology and functional analysis. He was a professor emeritus of mathematics at the University of Washington. He died at home in Seattle on September 25, 2019.

== Early life and education ==
Namioka was born in Tōno, not far from Namioka in the north of Honshu, Japan. When he was young his parents moved farther south, to Himeji. He attended graduate school at the University of California, Berkeley, earning a doctorate in 1956 under the supervision of John L. Kelley. As a graduate student, Namioka married Chinese-American mathematics student Lensey Namioka, later to become a well-known novelist who used Namioka's Japanese heritage in some of her novels.

== Career ==
Namioka taught at Cornell University until 1963, when he moved to the University of Washington. There he was the doctoral advisor to four students. He has over 20 academic descendants, largely through his student Joseph Rosenblatt, who became a professor at the University of Illinois at Urbana–Champaign.

== Contributions ==
Namioka's book Linear Topological Spaces with Kelley has become a "standard text". Although his doctoral work and this book both concerned general topology, his interests later shifted to functional analysis.

With Asplund in 1967, Namioka gave one of the first complete proofs of the Ryll-Nardzewski fixed-point theorem.

Following his 1974 paper "separate continuity and joint continuity", a Namioka space has come to mean a topological space X with the property that whenever Y is a compact space and function f from the Cartesian product of X and Y to Z is separately continuous in X and Y, there must exist a dense G_{δ} set within X whose Cartesian product with Y is a subset of the set of points of continuity of f. The result of the 1974 paper, a proof of this property for a specific class of topological spaces, has come to be known as Namioka's theorem.

In 1975, Namioka and Phelps established one side of the theorem that a space is an Asplund space if and only if its dual space has the Radon–Nikodým property. The other side was completed in 1978 by Stegall.

== Awards and honors ==
A special issue of the Journal of Mathematical Analysis and Applications was dedicated to Namioka to honor his 80th birthday. In 2012, he became one of the inaugural fellows of the American Mathematical Society.

== Selected publications ==
Books

- Partially Ordered Linear Topological Spaces (Memoirs of the American Mathematical Society 14, 1957)
- Linear Topological Spaces (with John L. Kelley, Van Nostrand, 1963; Graduate Texts in Mathematics 36, Springer-Verlag, 1976)

Research papers

- Namioka, I.; Asplund, E. (1967), "A geometric proof of Ryll-Nardzewski's fixed point theorem", Bulletin of the American Mathematical Society, 73 (3): 443–445, doi:10.1090/s0002-9904-1967-11779-8, MR 0209904.
- Namioka, I. (1974), "Separate continuity and joint continuity", Pacific Journal of Mathematics, 51 (2): 515–531, doi:10.2140/pjm.1974.51.515, MR 0370466.
- Namioka, I.; Phelps, R. R. (1975), "Banach spaces which are Asplund spaces", Duke Mathematical Journal, 42 (4): 735–750, doi:10.1215/s0012-7094-75-04261-1, MR 0390721.
