= Fort space =

Examples of topological spaces

In mathematics, there are a few topological spaces named after M. K. Fort, Jr.

== Fort space ==
Fort space is defined by taking an infinite set X, with a particular point p in X, and declaring open the subsets A of X such that:

- A does not contain p, or
- A contains all but a finite number of points of X.

The subspace $X\setminus\{p\}$ has the discrete topology and is open and dense in X. The space X is homeomorphic to the one-point compactification of an infinite discrete space.

== Modified Fort space ==
Modified Fort space is similar but has two particular points. So take an infinite set X with two distinct points p and q, and declare open the subsets A of X such that:

- A contains neither p nor q, or
- A contains all but a finite number of points of X.

The space X is compact and T_{1}, but not Hausdorff.

== Fortissimo space ==
Fortissimo space is defined by taking an uncountable set X, with a particular point p in X, and declaring open the subsets A of X such that:

- A does not contain p, or
- A contains all but a countable number of points of X.

The subspace $X\setminus\{p\}$ has the discrete topology and is open and dense in X. The space X is not compact, but it is a Lindelöf space. It is obtained by taking an uncountable discrete space, adding one point and defining a topology such that the resulting space is Lindelöf and contains the original space as a dense subspace. Similarly to Fort space being the one-point compactification of an infinite discrete space, one can describe Fortissimo space as the one-point Lindelöfication of an uncountable discrete space.

== See also ==
- Arens–Fort space – Topological space
- Cofinite topology – Being a subset whose complement is a finite set
- List of topologies – List of concrete topologies and topological spaces
