= Reese Prosser =

American mathematician

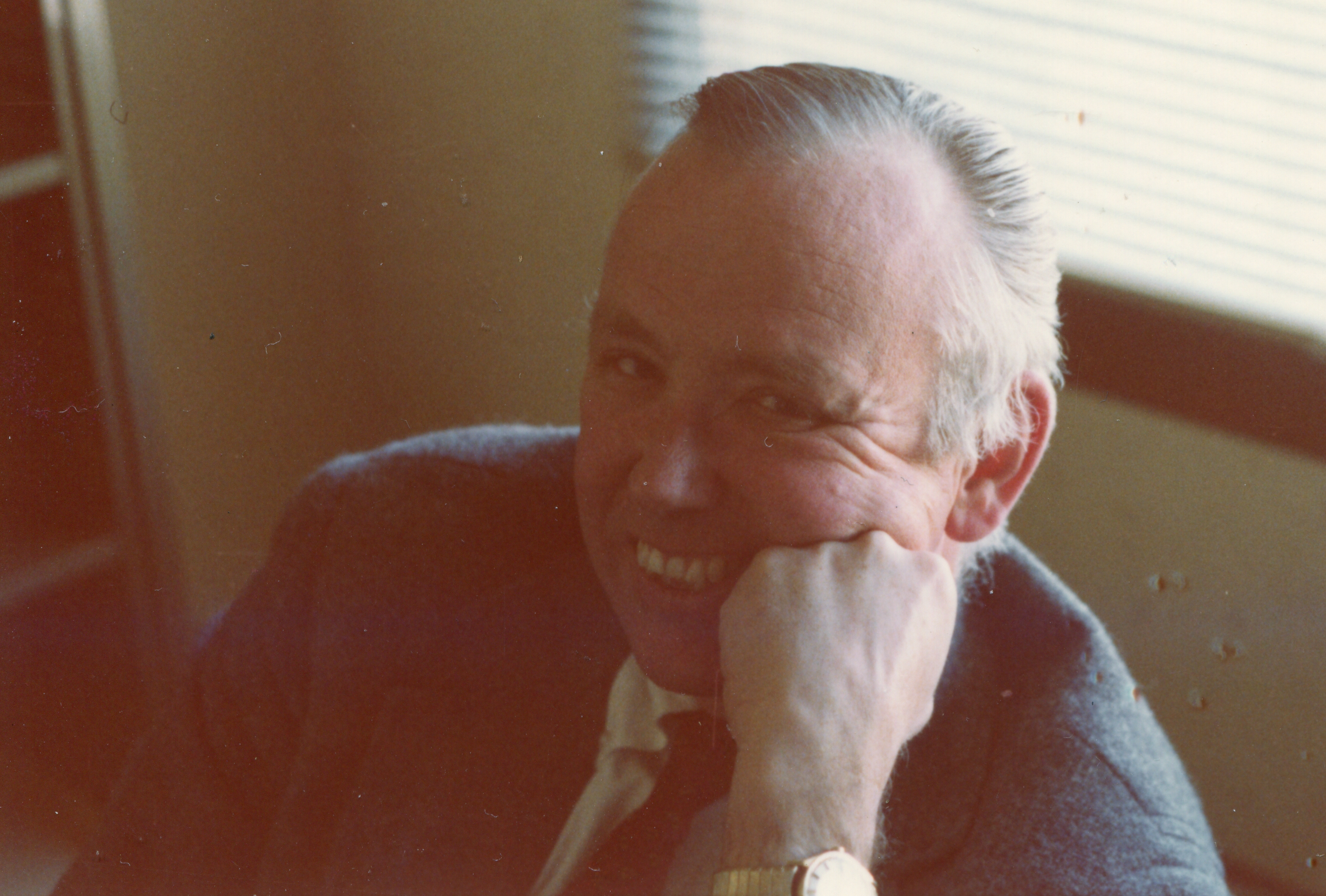
Prosser in 1974

Reese Trego Prosser (May 18, 1927 in Minneapolis – June 15, 1996) was an American mathematician.

He studied at Harvard University (A.B., 1949) and University of California at Berkeley under John L. Kelley (Ph.D. on the thesis Structure of Operator algebras, 1955), while working as numerical analyst at Lawrence Radiation Laboratory (1953–55). He then joined Duke University (instructor, 1955–56) and Massachusetts Institute of Technology (instructor, 1956). He also worked at Lincoln Laboratory (1958–66), among others contributing an early study on routing in packet switching computer networks, before becoming associate professor of mathematics at Dartmouth College (1966) and professor (1969). He served as a research associate at Harvard University (1973) and at University of California (1974 and 1980) while maintaining his professorship at Dartmouth College where he taught until his death in 1996.

Prosser was also a cellist and sailing devotee. The mathematics department at Dartmouth College opened the Prosser Memorial Lectures in 2002.
