= Functional flow block diagram =

Flow Diagram

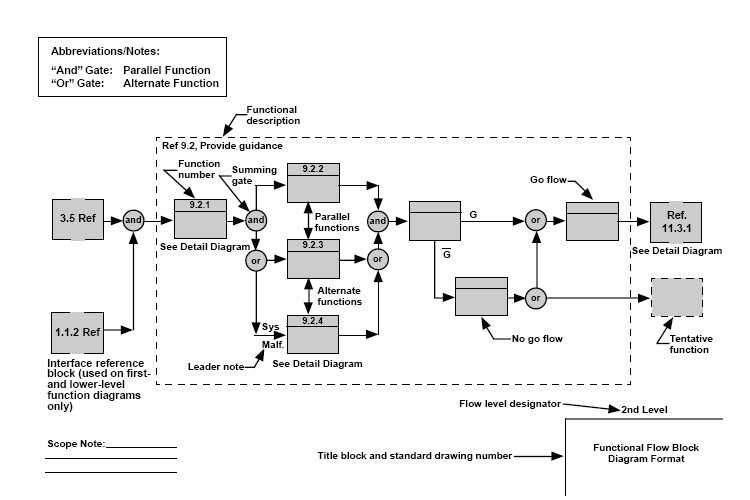
Figure 1: Functional flow block diagram format.

A functional flow block diagram (FFBD) is a multi-tier, time-sequenced, step-by-step flow diagram of a system's functional flow. The term "functional" in this context is different from its use in functional programming or in mathematics, where pairing "functional" with "flow" would be ambiguous. Here, "functional flow" pertains to the sequencing of operations, with "flow" arrows expressing dependence on the success of prior operations. FFBDs may also express input and output data dependencies between functional blocks, as shown in figures below, but FFBDs primarily focus on sequencing.

The FFBD notation was developed in the 1950s, and is widely used in classical systems engineering. FFBDs are one of the classic business process modeling methodologies, along with flow charts, data-flow diagrams, control-flow diagrams, Gantt charts, PERT diagrams, and IDEF.

FFBDs are also referred to as functional-flow diagrams, functional-block diagrams, and functional flows.

== History ==
The first structured method for documenting process flow, the flow process chart, was introduced by Frank Gilbreth to members of American Society of Mechanical Engineers (ASME) in 1921 as the presentation “Process Charts—First Steps in Finding the One Best Way”. Gilbreth's tools quickly found their way into industrial engineering curricula.

In the early 1930s, an industrial engineer, Allan H. Mogensen began training business people in the use of some of the tools of industrial engineering at his Work Simplification Conferences in Lake Placid, New York. A 1944 graduate of Mogensen's class, Art Spinanger, took the tools back to Procter and Gamble where he developed their Deliberate Methods Change Program. Another 1944 graduate, Ben S. Graham, Director of Formcraft Engineering at Standard Register Industrial, adapted the flow process chart to information processing with his development of the multi-flow process chart to display multiple documents and their relationships. In 1947, ASME adopted a symbol set as the ASME Standard for Operation and Flow Process Charts, derived from Gilbreth's original work.

The modern Functional Flow Block Diagram was developed by TRW Incorporated, a defense-related business, in the 1950s. In the 1960s it was exploited by NASA to visualize the time sequence of events in space systems and flight missions. FFBDs became widely used in classical systems engineering to show the order of execution of system functions.

== Development of functional flow block diagrams ==
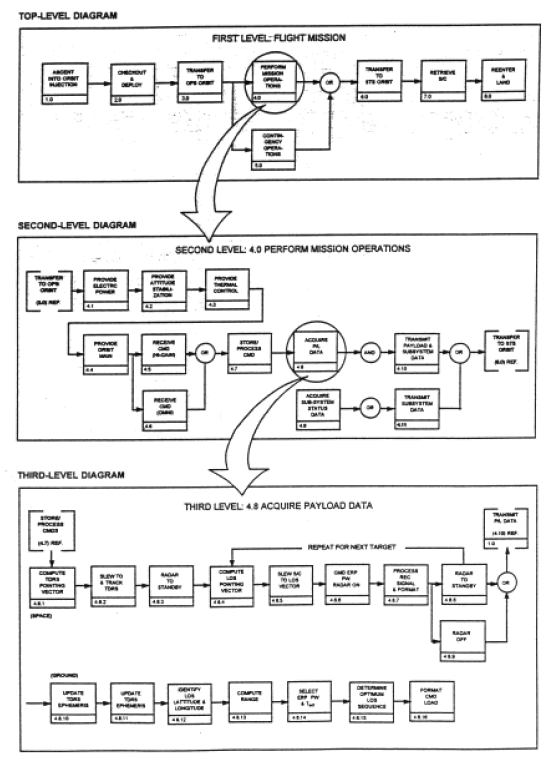
Figure 2: Development of functional flow block diagrams

FFBDs can be developed in a series of levels. FFBDs show the same tasks identified through functional decomposition and display them in their logical, sequential relationship. For example, the entire flight mission of a spacecraft can be defined in a top level FFBD, as shown in Figure 2. Each block in the first level diagram can then be expanded to a series of functions, as shown in the second level diagram for "perform mission operations." Note that the diagram shows both input (transfer to operational orbit) and output (transfer to space transportation system orbit), thus initiating the interface identification and control process. Each block in the second level diagram can be progressively developed into a series of functions, as shown in the third level diagram on Figure 2.

These diagrams are used both to develop requirements and to identify profitable trade studies. For example, does the spacecraft antenna acquire the tracking and data relay satellite (TDRS) only when the payload data are to be transmitted, or does it track TDRS continually to allow for the reception of emergency commands or transmission of emergency data? The FFBD also incorporates alternate and contingency operations, which improve the probability of mission success. The flow diagram provides an understanding of total operation of the system, serves as a basis for development of operational and contingency procedures, and pinpoints areas where changes in operational procedures could simplify the overall system operation. In certain cases, alternate FFBDs may be used to represent various means of satisfying a particular function until data are acquired, which permits selection among the alternatives.

== Building blocks ==
=== Key attributes ===
An overview of the key FFBD attributes:

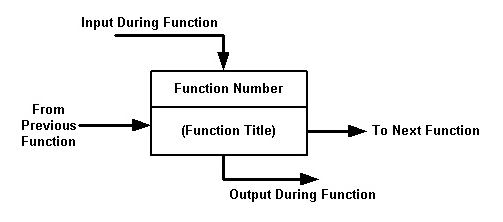
Graphical explanation of a "function block" used in these diagrams. Flow is from left to right.

- Function block: Each function on an FFBD should be separate and be represented by single box (solid line). Each function needs to stand for definite, finite, discrete action to be accomplished by system elements.
- Function numbering: Each level should have a consistent number scheme and provide information concerning function origin. These numbers establish identification and relationships that will carry through all Functional Analysis and Allocation activities and facilitate traceability from lower to top levels.
- Functional reference: Each diagram should contain a reference to other functional diagrams by using a functional title reference (box in brackets).
- Flow connection: Lines connecting functions should only indicate function flow and not a lapse in time or intermediate activity.
- Flow direction: Diagrams should be laid out so that the flow direction is generally from left to right. Arrows are often used to indicate functional flows.
- Summing gate: A circle is used to denote a summing gate and is used when AND/OR is present. AND is used to indicate parallel functions and all conditions must be satisfied to proceed. OR is used to indicate that alternative paths can be satisfied to proceed.
- GO and NO-GO path: “G” and “bar G” are used to denote “go” and “no-go” conditions. These symbols are placed adjacent to lines leaving a particular function to indicate alternative paths.

=== Function symbolism ===
A function shall be represented by a rectangle containing the title of the function (an action verb followed by a noun phrase) and its unique decimal delimited number. A horizontal line shall separate this number and the title, as shown in see Figure 3 above. The figure also depicts how to represent a reference function, which provides context within a specific FFBD. See Figure 9 for an example regarding use of a reference function.

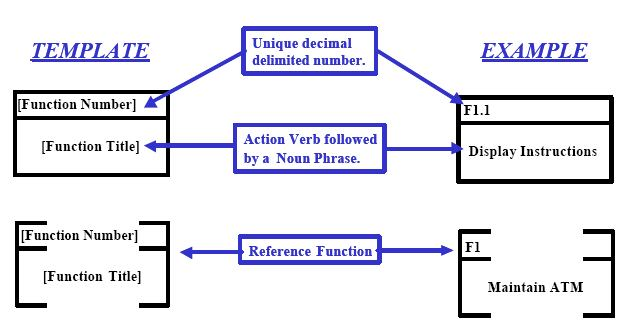
Figure 3. Function symbol

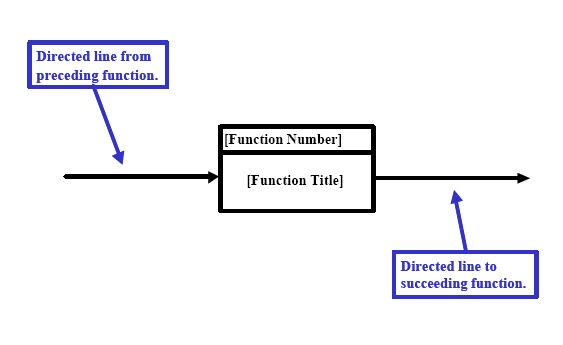
Figure 4. Directed lines

=== Directed lines ===
A line with a single arrowhead shall depict functional flow from left to right, see Figure 4.

=== Logic symbols ===
The following basic logic symbols shall be used.

- AND: A condition in which all preceding or succeeding paths are required. The symbol may contain a single input with multiple outputs or multiple inputs with a single output, but not multiple inputs and outputs combined (Figure 5). Read the figure as follows: F2 AND F3 may begin in parallel after completion of F1. Likewise, F4 may begin after completion of F2 AND F3.

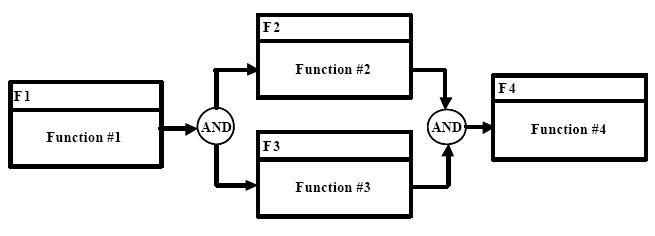
Figure 5. "AND" symbol

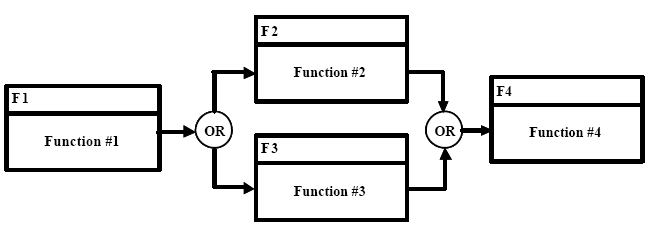
Figure 6. "Exclusive OR" Symbol

- Exclusive OR: A condition in which one of multiple preceding or succeeding paths is required, but not all. The symbol may contain a single input with multiple outputs or multiple inputs with single output, but not multiple inputs and outputs combined (Figure 6). Read the figure as follows: F2 OR F3 may begin after completion of F1. Likewise, F4 may begin after completion of either F2 OR F3.
- Inclusive OR: A condition in which one, some, or all of the multiple preceding or succeeding paths are required. Figure 7 depicts Inclusive OR logic using a combination of the AND symbol (Figure 5) and the Exclusive OR symbol (Figure 6). Read Figure 7 as follows: F2 OR F3 (exclusively) may begin after completion of F1, OR (again exclusive) F2 AND F3 may begin after completion of F1. Likewise, F4 may begin after completion of either F2 OR F3 (exclusively), OR (again exclusive) F4 may begin after completion of both F2 AND F3

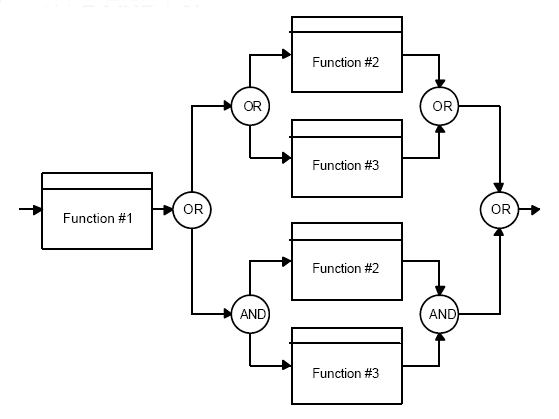
Figure 7. "Inclusive OR" logic

=== Contextual and administrative data ===
Each FFBD shall contain the following contextual and administrative data:

- Date the diagram was created
- Name of the engineer, organization, or working group that created the diagram
- Unique decimal delimited number of the function being diagrammed
- Unique function name of the function being diagrammed.

Figure 8 and Figure 9 present the data in an FFBD. Figure 9 is a decomposition of the function F2 contained in Figure 8 and illustrates the context between functions at different levels of the model.

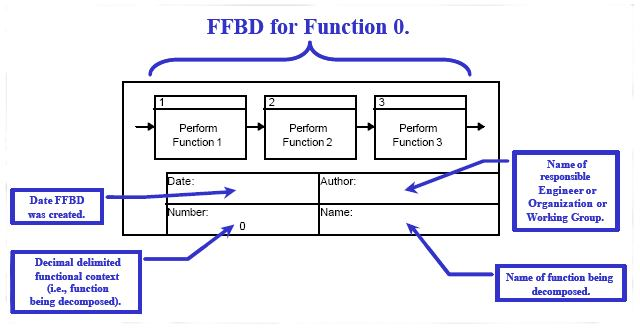
Figure 8. FFBD Function 0 illustration

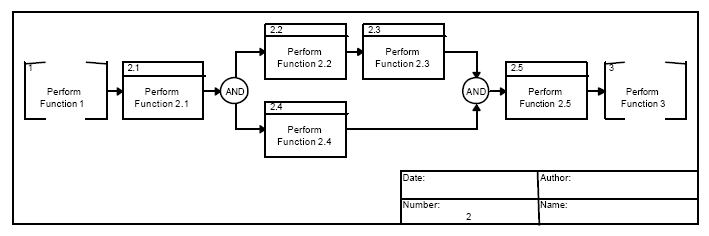
Figure 9. FFBD Function 2 illustration

== See also ==
- Activity diagram
- Block diagram
- Business process mapping
- Dataflow
- Data and information visualization
- DRAKON
- Flow diagram
- Flow process chart
- Function model
- Functional block diagram
- IDEF0
- N2 Chart
- SADT
- Signal flow
- Signal-flow graph
