= CFD =

CFD may refer to:

== Business and economics ==
- Centre for Finance and Development in Geneva, Switzerland
- Contract for difference, a type of financial derivative
- Contracts for Difference (UK energy), market support mechanism for low carbon electricity generation in the UK
- Control-flow diagram, of a process
- Cumulative flow diagram, in queueing theory

== Firefighting services ==
- Calgary Fire Department, Alberta, Canada
- Chicago Fire Department, Illinois, U.S.
- Cleveland Fire Department, Ohio, U.S.
- Columbus Fire Department, Ohio, U.S.

== Science and technology ==
- Common fill device, in cryptography
- Complement factor D, an enzyme
- Computational fluid dynamics
- Congenital Femoral Deficiency, a birth defect
- Constant fraction discriminator, a signal processing device
- Counterfactual definiteness, a concept in quantum mechanics

== Transport ==
- Caulfield railway station, Melbourne
- Clarkefield railway station, Melbourne
- Coulter Field (IATA and FAA LID: CFD), an airport in Bryan, Texas, U.S.
- Compagnie des chemins de fer départementaux, French rail company in JV with Captrain France

== See also ==
- Cfds (disambiguation)
