= Raptor (programming language) =

Graphical authoring tool

RAPTOR
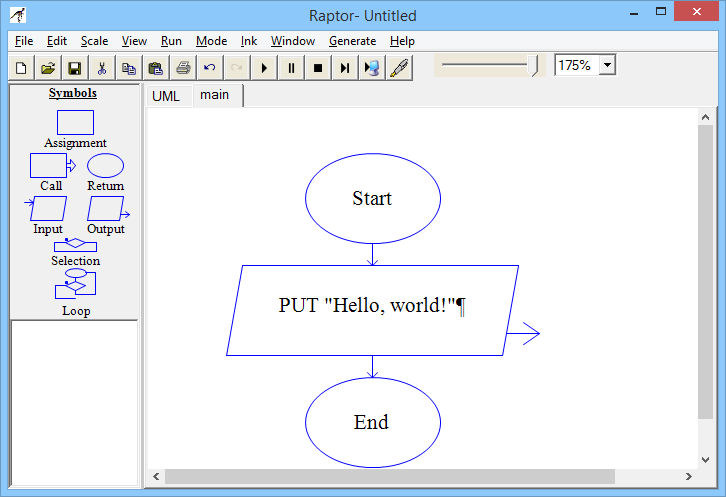
- Paradigm: structured, imperative
- Designed by: Martin Carlisle
- Stable release: 4.0.6 / April 22, 2015
- Typing discipline: Weak
- OS: Microsoft Windows
- License: GNU General Public License (free software)
- Filename extensions: .rap
- Website: raptor.martincarlisle.com

Influenced by
- Flowcharts

RAPTOR, the Rapid Algorithmic Prototyping Tool for Ordered Reasoning, is a flowchart-based authoring tool created by Martin C. Carlisle, Terry Wilson, Jeff Humphries and Jason Moore. It is hosted and maintained by former US Air Force Academy and current Texas A&M University professor Martin Carlisle.

RAPTOR allows users to write and execute programs using flowcharts. The simple language and graphical components of RAPTOR are designed to teach the major ideas of computer programming to students. It is typically used in academics to teach introductory programming concepts as well.

== See also ==
Other educational programming languages include:

- Alice (software)
- Flowgorithm
- LARP
- Visual Logic
- Scratch
