= Business process mapping =

Activities involved in defining what a business entity does and who is responsible

Business process mapping refers to activities involved in defining what a business entity does, who is responsible, to what standard a business process should be completed, and how the success of a business process can be determined.

The main purpose behind business process mapping is to assist organizations in becoming more effective. A clear and detailed business process map or diagram allows outside firms to come in and look at whether or not improvements can be made to the current process.

Business process mapping takes a specific objective and helps to measure and compare that objective alongside the entire organization's objectives to make sure that all processes are aligned with the company's values and capabilities.

International Organization for Standardization or ISO 9001 : 2015 encourages a process approach to quality management. The relationship between each process within the organization and how those interactions impact Quality Management is significant.

== History ==
=== Early history ===
The first structured method for documenting process flow, the flow process chart, was introduced by Frank Gilbreth to members of ASME in 1921 as the presentation “Process Charts—First Steps in Finding the One Best Way”. Gilbreth's tools were quickly integrated into industrial engineering curricula. In the early 1930s industrial engineer Allan H. Mogensen began training business people by using these tools of industrial engineering at his Work Simplification Conferences in Lake Placid, New York. A 1944 graduate of Mogensen's class, Art Spinanger, took the tools back to Procter and Gamble where he developed their work simplification program called the Deliberate Methods Change Program. Another 1944 graduate, Ben S. Graham, Director of Formcraft Engineering at Standard Register Industrial, adapted the flow process chart to information processing with his development of the multi-flow process chart to display multiple documents and their relationships. In 1947, ASME adopted a symbol set derived from Gilbreth's original work as the ASME Standard for Process Charts.

Business process mapping, also known as process charting, has become much more prevalent and understood in the business world in recent years. Process maps can be used in every section of life or business.

The Major Steps of Process Improvement using Process Mapping

1. Process identification - identify objectives, scope, players and work areas.
2. Information gathering - gather process facts (what, who, where, when) from the people who do the work.
3. Process Mapping - convert facts into a process map.
4. Analysis - work through the map, challenging each step (what-why?, who-why?, where-why?, when-why?, how-why?)
5. Develop/Install New Methods - eliminate unnecessary work, combine steps, rearrange steps, add new steps where necessary
6. Manage process - maintain process map in library, review routinely, and monitor process for changes

Process mapping is capable of supporting several important business goals:

- Business process improvement
- Training
- Process / workflow clarification
- Regulatory compliance
- Internal audit
- Role clarity (RACI)

=== Recent developments ===
Process mapping has overlapped with software development incorporating tools that can attach metadata to activities, drivers and triggers to provide some automation of software process coding.

Quality improvement practitioners have noted that various graphical descriptions of processes can be useful. These include: detailed flow-charts, work flow diagrams and value stream maps. Each map is helpful depending on the process questions and theories being considered. In these situations process map implies the use of process flow and the current understanding of the causal structure.

Six Sigma practitioners use the term Business Process Architecture to describe the mapping of business processes as series of cross-functional flowcharts. Under this school of thought, each flowchart is of a certain level (between 0 and 4) based on the amount of detail the flowchart contains. A level 0 flowchart represents the least amount of detail, and usually contains one or two steps. A level 4 flowchart represents the most detail, and can include hundreds of steps. At this level every task, however minor, is represented.

=== Primary example ===
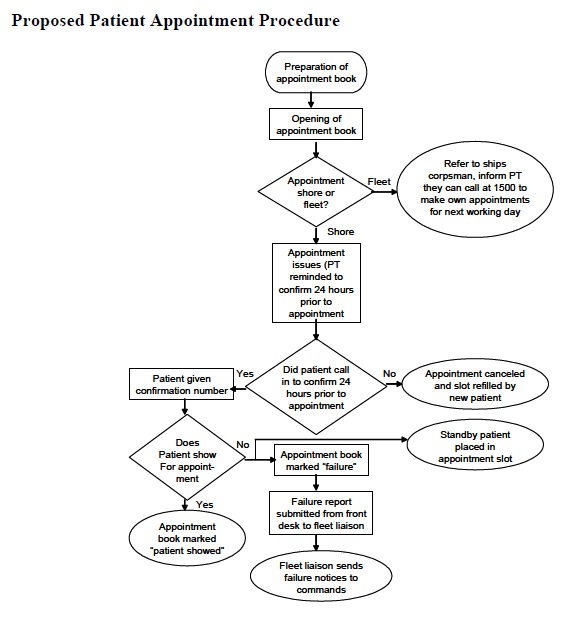
Proposed Patient Appointment Procedure

Flowchart is a primary type of business process mapping. It consists of some symbols such as arrows, circles, diamonds, boxes, ovals, or rectangles. The type of Flowchart just described is sometimes referred to as a "detailed" flowchart because it includes in detail, the inputs, activities, decision points, and outputs of any process.

The example is Proposed Patient Appointment Procedure. It starts with "preparation of appointment book" followed by a decision whether the appointment is shore or fleet. If the appointment is fleet, inform patient they can call 1500 to make own appointments for next few days, if the appointment is shore, confirm 24 hours prior to appointment. Next confirm that the patient confirmed. If a patient did not call, the appointment is canceled, otherwise the patient is given a confirmation number. Finally confirm that the patient showed for the appointment. If not, a standby patient is placed in the appointment slot, the appointment book is marked "Failure" and a failure report is submitted from front desk to fleet liaison. If a patient showed for appointment, put "Patient showed" in appointment book.

=== Example ===
An easy example to follow is making breakfast:

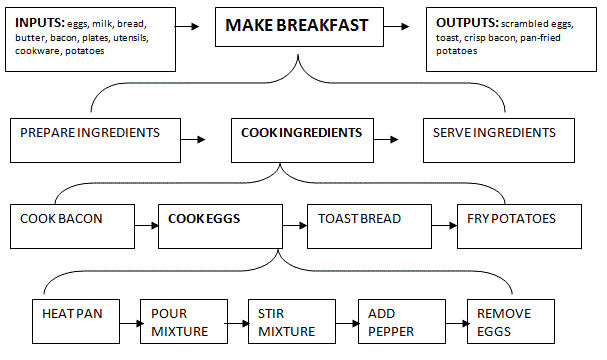

We must first understand that making breakfast is a process. The ingredients are the inputs and the final breakfast ready to be served is the output. This graph shows the breakdown of each process vertically and horizontally. For instance, cooking ingredients is broken down into all of the different tasks that need to be done: cook bacon, cook eggs, toast bread, and fry potatoes. These tasks are then broken down further below. In order to cook eggs, one must first heat the pan, pour the mixture, stir mixture, add pepper, and remove eggs. This is a prime example of how process mapping can be used in any situation/process in order to understand all of the different parts so that we can complete the process with a better understanding for more efficiency. Although this is just a simple example, many aspects of business, including supply chain, operations, marketing, finance, and accounting, use similar process mapping activities to improve efficiency.

== See also ==
- Business Model Canvas
- Business process discovery
- Business process modeling
- DRAKON
- Ethnography
- IDEF
- N2 chart
- Organizational studies
- Process-centered design
- Structured Analysis and Design Technique
- Systems engineering
- Value stream mapping
- Workflow
