= Visual Logic =

- Paradigm: structured, imperative
- Stable release: 2.2.10 / 2014
- Typing discipline: Weak
- OS: Microsoft Windows
- License: Proprietary license
- Filename extensions: .vls, .vlsig
- Website: www.visuallogic.org

Influenced by
- Flowcharts

Visual Logic is a graphical authoring tool which allows students to write and execute programs using flowcharts. It is typically used in an academic setting to teach introductory programming concepts.

== See also ==
- Alice
- Flowgorithm
- Raptor
- Scratch
