= Flow process chart =

Industrial engineering graphical representation

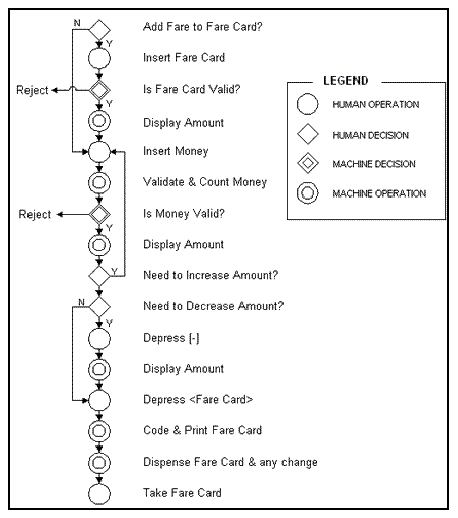
Subway Fare Card Machine Flow Process Chart (which doesn't use the ASME standard set of symbols).

The flow process chart is a graphical and symbolic representation of the activities performed on the work piece during the operation in industrial engineering.

== History ==
The first structured method for documenting process flow, e.g., in flow shop scheduling, the flow process chart, was introduced by Frank and Lillian Gilbreth to members of ASME in 1921 as the presentation "Process Charts, First Steps in Finding the One Best Way to Do Work". The Gilbreths' tools quickly found their way into industrial engineering curricula.

In the early 1930s, an industrial engineer, Allan H. Mogensen, began training business people in the use of some of the tools of industrial engineering at his Work Simplification Conferences in Lake Placid, New York. A 1944 graduate of Mogensen's class, Art Spinanger, took the tools back to Procter and Gamble, where he developed their Deliberate Methods Change Program. Another 1944 graduate, Ben S. Graham, Director of Formcraft Engineering at Standard Register Corporation, adapted the flow process chart to information processing with his development of the multi-flow process chart to display multiple documents and their relationships. In 1947, ASME adopted a symbol set derived from the Gilbreths' original work as the ASME Standard for Process Charts.

== Symbols ==
Symbol	Letter	Description	
Ο	O	Operation	to change the physical or chemical characteristics of the material.
Ỻ	I	Inspection	to check the quality or the quantity of the material.
→	M	Transport	transporting the material from one place to another.
D	D	Delay	when material cannot go to the next activity.
∇	S	Storage	when the material is kept in a safe location.

== See also ==
- Business process mapping
- Control-flow diagram
- Data-flow diagram
- Flowchart
- Functional flow block diagram
- Workflow
