= Flow graph =

Flow graph may refer to:

- Flow or rooted graph (graph theory), a graph in which a vertex has been distinguished as the root
- Control-flow graph (computer science), a representation of paths through a program during its execution
- Flow graph (mathematics), a directed graph linked to a set of linear algebraic or differential equations
- Flow network, a directed graph where each edge has a capacity and receives a flow
- Signal-flow graph, a directed graph with nodes as system variables and branches as node connections

== See also ==
- Flow diagram, a diagram representing a flow or set of dynamic relationships in a system
- Flowchart, a diagram representing a process as boxes connected with arrows
