= Cfds =

CFDS may refer to:

- Canadian Forces Dental Services, later Royal Canadian Dental Corps
- Chartered Financial Divorce Specialist, in Canada
- Commission for Dark Skies (CfDS), UK
- Contracts for difference (CFDs), in financial markets
- Contracts for Difference (UK energy) (CFDs), UK energy policy

== See also ==
- CFD (disambiguation)
