= Functional analysis and allocation =

Functional Analysis and Allocation, in the systems engineering process, bridges the gap between requirements engineering and design. This step in the process transforms stakeholder requirements into a logical and functional architecture, and provides the inputs to the design, integration, and verification activities.

== Motivation ==
The functional analysis and allocation step of the systems engineering process is critical for managing the complexity of multidisciplinary systems.

== Methodologies ==
There are several methodologies for performing functional analysis:

Functional decomposition

Functional decomposition is used to break down top-level functions into lower-level sub-functions to provide a hierarchical structure of the functionality.

Function analysis system technique (FAST)

Like functional decomposition, FAST is used to decompose a system's functions into sub-functions. In addition, it analyzes the logical relationships between those functions. The methodology uses the FAST diagram in order to assist the brainstorming process. For each top level function, the diagram maps "how" the function is achieved, "why" the function is needed, and which functions support the main function.

Use case analysis

Use case analysis is used for both functional requirement identification, and the refinement of those requirements.

N^{2} chart

N-squared charts are used for analyzing relationships, both physical and functional.

== Functional architecture description ==
The output of the functional analysis and allocation process is a functional specification.

== General references ==
- Object Management Group (OMG). OMG Systems Modeling Language (OMG SysML®), Version 1.6, 2019. Retrieved from omg.org.
- Blanchard, B. S., & Fabrycky, W. J. Systems Engineering and Analysis. 5th ed. Pearson, 2010.
- Martin, J. N. Systems Engineering Guidebook: A Process for Developing Systems and Products. CRC Press, 1997.
- Dickerson, C., & Mavris, D. Architecture and Principles of Systems Engineering. CRC Press, 2009.
