= FBD =

FBD may refer to:

== Science and technology ==
- Flange back distance, in mounting camera lenses
- Free body diagram, helps visualise forces on bodies
- Fully Buffered DIMM, computer memory module
- Function block diagram, a graphical language for programmable logic controller design
- Functional block diagram, a block diagram in systems engineering

== Transport ==
- Braine-l'Alleud railway station, in Belgium
- Flemington Bridge railway station, in England
- Farrukhabad Junction railway station, in Uttar Pradesh, India
- Fayzabad Airport, in Afghanistan

== Other uses ==
- Far Beyond Driven, an album by American metal band Pantera
- FBD Holdings, an Irish insurance company
- Freshfields Bruckhaus Deringer, a British law firm
