= Office management =

Profession

Office management is a profession involving the design, implementation, evaluation, and maintenance of the process of work within an office or other organization, in order to sustain and improve efficiency and productivity.

Office management is thus a part of the overall administration of business and since the elements of management are forecasting and planning, organizing, command, control and coordination, the office is a part of the total management function.

Office management can be defined as “a distinct process of planning, organizing, staffing, directing, coordinating and controlling office in order to facilitate achievement of objectives of any business enterprise’ the definition shows managerial functions of an administrative manager. Following diagram indicates various elements or functions in the process of office management.

== Functions ==
An office manager is responsible for monitoring and reviewing systems, usually focusing on specific outcomes such as improved timescales, turnover, output, sales, etc. They may supervise or manage a team of administrators, allocating roles, recruiting and training, and issuing assignments and projects. As such the role is varied, often including responsibilities across a diverse range of functions such as:

- Bookkeeping
- Business process mapping
- Cost accounting
- Customer service
- Database management
- Facility management
- Design of form or document templates
- Human resources
- Management information systems
- Management consulting
- Occupational safety and health
- Payroll
- Project management
- Purchasing
- Records management
- Recruitment
- Report writing
- Risk management
- Sales and marketing
- Security management
- Space management
- Systems analysis
- Website maintenance

Personal competencies useful in the role are: problem solving skills, good decision-making abilities, integrity, resourcefulness, creativity, assertiveness, flexibility, time management skills and the ability to cope with pressure.

== See also ==
- Chief administrative officer
- Office equipment
- Association of Information Technology Professionals (AITP)
