= Interactive EasyFlow =

Diagramming software

HavenTree Software Limited
- Industry: Computer software
- Founded: 1981
- Defunct: 1996
- Fate: Assets were sold to SPSS Inc.
- Successor: none
- Headquarters: Kingston, Ontario, Canada
- Key people: C. Farnell (founder) Bill Reid (technology) John Purdon (last CEO)
- Products: Interactive EasyFlow; EasyFlow Macintosh; EasyFlow for Windows; NodeMap; NodeMap for Windows
- Number of employees: 30 (cca 1990)

Easyflow was one of the first diagramming and flow charting software packages available for personal computers. It was produced by HavenTree Software Limited of Kingston, Ontario Canada. HavenTree's mark on history for its product, which was subsequently renamed Interactive Easyflow, is its notable plain-English license.

== History ==
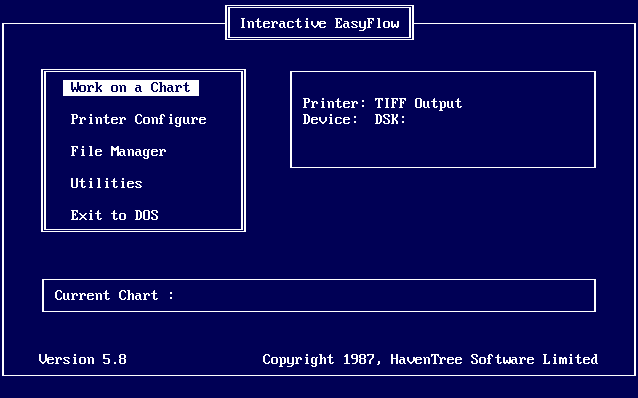
Main menu, from Interactive EasyFlow for DOS 5.8

HavenTree was formed in 1981. Easyflow, a DOS-based software package, was the initial name of the company's flagship offering, which was non-interactive and introduced in 1983. "EasyFlow-Plus" was announced in 1984. Interactive EasyFlow - so named to distinguish it from the preceding products - was offered from 1985 until the early 1990s, when the company dropped the "Interactive" adjective in favour of simply "HavenTree EasyFlow". It offered the software for sale until it filed for protection under Canada's Bankruptcy and Insolvency Act in April 1996. The assets of the company were purchased by SPSS Inc. in 1998.

== Historical significance ==
HavenTree and EasyFlow is mostly remembered today for its counter-cultural disclaimer and end-user license agreement. Both were written in plain English and not in legalese, enabling end users to understand better the terms of these legal agreements, and emphasizing the problems with modern software licensing. Excerpts from the license and disclaimer are included into the fortune databases of many Linux and BSD distributions.

=== Text of software license ===
This is where the bloodthirsty licensing agreement is supposed to go, explaining that Interactive Easyflow is a copyrighted package licensed for use by a single person, and sternly warning you not to pirate copies of it and explaining, in detail, the gory consequences if you do.

We know that you are an honest person, and are not going to go around pirating copies of Interactive Easyflow; this is just as well with us since we worked hard to perfect it and selling copies of it is our only method of making anything out of all the hard work. For your convenience EasyFlow is distributed on a non copy-protected diskette and you are free to do what you want with it (make backups, move from machine to machine, etc.) provided that it is never in use by more than one person at a time.

If, on the other hand, you are one of those few people who do go around pirating copies of software you probably aren't going to pay much attention to a license agreement, bloodthirsty or not. Just keep your doors locked and look out for the HavenTree attack shark.

=== Text of disclaimer ===
We don't claim Interactive EasyFlow is good for anything -- if you think it is, great, but it's up to you to decide. If Interactive EasyFlow doesn't work: tough. If you lose a million because Interactive EasyFlow messes up, it's you that's out the million, not us. If you don't like this disclaimer: tough. We reserve the right to do the absolute minimum provided by law, up to and including nothing.

This is basically the same disclaimer that comes with all software packages, but ours is in plain English and theirs is in legalese.

We didn't really want to include any disclaimer at all, but our lawyers insisted. We tried to ignore them but they threatened us with the attack shark at which point we relented.

== Patenting ==
Patent entries are dated in the 1990s.
