= Control-flow diagram =

Business process modeling tool

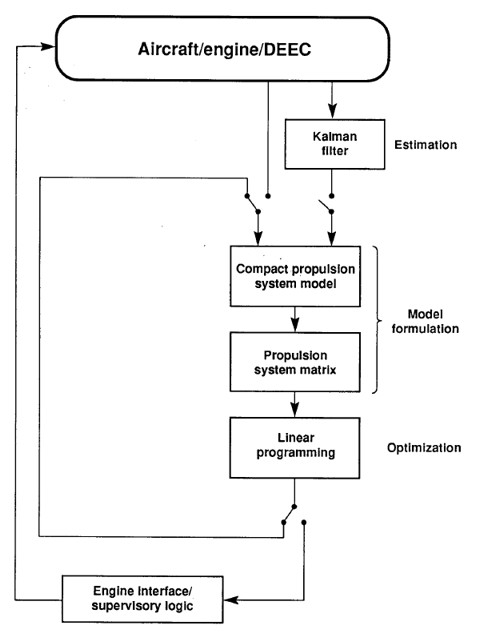
Example of a "performance seeking" control-flow diagram.

A control-flow diagram (CFD) is a diagram to describe the control flow of a business process, process or review.

Control-flow diagrams were developed in the 1950s, and are widely used in multiple engineering disciplines. They are one of the classic business process modeling methodologies, along with flow charts, drakon-charts, data flow diagrams, functional flow block diagram, Gantt charts, PERT diagrams, and IDEF.

== Overview ==
A control-flow diagram can consist of a subdivision to show sequential steps, with if-then-else conditions, repetition, and/or case conditions. Suitably annotated geometrical figures are used to represent operations, data, or equipment, and arrows are used to indicate the sequential flow from one to another.

There are several types of control-flow diagrams, for example:

- Change-control-flow diagram, used in project management
- Configuration-decision control-flow diagram, used in configuration management
- Process-control-flow diagram, used in process management
- Quality-control-flow diagram, used in quality control.

In software and systems development, control-flow diagrams can be used in control-flow analysis, data-flow analysis, algorithm analysis, and simulation. Control and data are most applicable for real time and data-driven systems. These flow analyses transform logic and data requirements text into graphic flows which are easier to analyze than the text. PERT, state transition, and transaction diagrams are examples of control-flow diagrams.

== Types of control-flow diagrams ==
=== Process-control-flow diagram ===
A flow diagram can be developed for the process [control system] for each critical activity. Process control is normally a closed cycle in which a sensor. The application determines if the sensor information is within the predetermined (or calculated) data parameters and constraints. The results of this comparison, which controls the critical component. This [feedback] may control the component electronically or may indicate the need for a manual action. This closed-cycle process has many checks and balances to ensure that it stays safe. It may be fully computer controlled and automated, or it may be a hybrid in which only the sensor is automated and the action requires manual intervention. Further, some process control systems may use prior generations of hardware and software, while others are state of the art.

=== Performance-seeking control-flow diagram ===
The figure presents an example of a performance-seeking control-flow diagram of the algorithm. The control law consists of estimation, modeling, and optimization processes. In the Kalman filter estimator, the inputs, outputs, and residuals were recorded. At the compact propulsion-system-modeling stage, all the estimated inlet and engine parameters were recorded.

In addition to temperatures, pressures, and control positions, such estimated parameters as stall margins, thrust, and drag components were recorded. In the optimization phase, the operating-condition constraints, optimal solution, and linear-programming health-status condition codes were recorded. Finally, the actual commands that were sent to the engine through the DEEC were recorded.

== See also ==
- Data-flow diagram
- Data and information visualization
- Control-flow graph
- DRAKON
- Flow process chart
