= Functional block diagram =

Diagram used in engineering

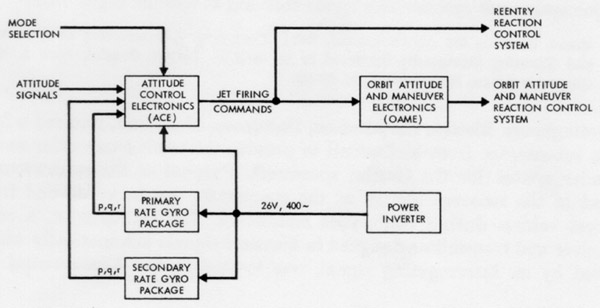
Functional block diagram of the attitude control and maneuvering electronics system of the Gemini spacecraft. June 1962.

A functional block diagram, in systems engineering and software engineering, is a block diagram that describes the functions and interrelationships of a system.

The functional block diagram can picture:

- functions of a system pictured by blocks
- input and output elements of a block pictured with lines
- the relationships between the functions, and
- the functional sequences and paths for matter and or signals

The block diagram can use additional schematic symbols to show particular properties.

Since the late 1950s, functional block diagrams have been used in a wide range applications, from systems engineering to software engineering. They became a necessity in complex systems design to "understand thoroughly from exterior design the operation of the present system and the relationship of each of the parts to the whole."

Many specific types of functional block diagrams have emerged. For example, the functional flow block diagram is a combination of the functional block diagram and the flowchart. Many software development methodologies are built with specific functional block diagram techniques. An example from the field of industrial computing is the Function Block Diagram (FBD), a graphical language for the development of software applications for programmable logic controllers.

== See also ==
- Function model
- Functional flow block diagram
