= Allan H. Mogensen =

Allan Herbert Mogensen, known as Mogy, (May 12, 1901 – March 1989) was an American industrial engineer, and industry consultant, and an authority in the field of work simplification and office management. He is noted for popularizing flowcharts in the 1930s, and is remembered as "father of work simplification"

== Biography ==
=== Youth, education and early career ===
Mogensen was born in Paxtang, Pennsylvania in 1901, son of Olaf E. Mogensen and Birgitte M. Mogensen. He obtained his BA in Industrial Engineering at Cornell University, where he had studied the methods of Frank Bunker Gilbreth, Sr.

After his graduation Morgensen started as industrial engineering consultant, among other places at the Eastman Kodak. In his consultancy practice he experienced, that improvements made by employees on the work floor were the most successful. With other principles he developed the concept of work simplification, which he explained in his 1932 book Common sense applied to motion and time study.

=== Further career and honours ===
In the 1930s Mogensen further experimented with time and motion studies using motion pictures. After conducting training sessions in large firms, in 1937 Morgensen, Lillian Gilbreth and associates started training business people in work simplification methods and business process modeling in his Work Simplification Conferences in Lake Placid, New York.

In 1944 Art Spinanger attended Mogensen's classes, and back at Procter and Gamble started their remarkable "Deliberate Methods Change" program. Another of their students was Benjamin S. Graham, who started applying scientific management and industrial engineering techniques to offices and clerical work in factories, and coined the concept of paperwork simplification.

Early 1940s Mogensen was noted for making movies of operations in hospitals, where he discovered that surgeons could work faster by avoiding lost motions, and in doing so reduce the mortality rate. At Lake Placid Mogensen kept organizing the Work Simplification Conferences for almost 50 years.

In 1982 Mogensen was awarded the Taylor Key, one of the highest awards of the Society for Advancement of Management.

== Selected publications ==
- Allan H. Mogensen (1932). Common sense applied to motion and time study. New York and London, Pub. for Factory and industrial management by the McGraw-Hill book company, Inc.
- John T. Sinkey, and Allan H. Mogensen (1938) Time and motion economy in the office. New York: American management association.
- Richard Muther (1961) Systematic Layout Planning: By Richard Muther; Foreword by Allan H. Mogensen
- Allan H. Mogensen, Rosario Rausa (1989) Mogy: an autobiography : "father of work simplification".

Articles, a selection

- Allan H. Mogensen (1949) "Carry Out a Methods Improvement Program". In: Factory Management and Maintenance, July, 1949, p. 66-88
- John E. Burns (1973) "Allan H. Mogensen--The Man Who Started It All". In: Industrial Management, Vol. 15 Issue 6, p. 7

== Quotes ==
- "First of all, we resist anything that is new; secondly, we all resent criticism." (p. 17)

"Comparison with similar practices or parts of such practices may offer opportunities for radical revision" (p. 39)
"A chart of the process finally adopted serves as a basis for still further and stimulative improvements. Arrangements should be made for periodical review." (p. 39)
"The process chart enables one to reject the things which are just new—unless they are really better" (p. 40)
- Allan H. Mogensen (1932) Common Sense Applied to Motion and Time Study. McGraw-Hill

- [Work Simplification is] "the organized use of common sense by everyone involved to find easier and better ways of doing work."
  - Attributed to Allan H. Mogensen in: Teledyne Ryan Aeronautical reporter (1955). Vol 16-18. p.
- In order to achieve measurement, tools are needed and the most important of these is the process chart....Once a process chart has been drawn up, common sense is all that is needed to improve efficiency and better the process being examined....The process chart then, is the lifeblood of work simplification. It is an irreplaceable tool. It is a guide and stimulant. It takes time to properly utilize but there is absolutely no doubt that it works.
  - Allan H. Mogensen with Rosario “Zip” Rausa, Mogy: An Autobiography (Idea Associates, 1989), p. 44–46 (as cited in)
- "The person doing the job knows far more than anyone else as to the best way of doing that job, and therefore is the one person best fitted to improve it."
  - As cited in Graham (2004)
