= Cumulative flow diagram =

Queueing theory tool

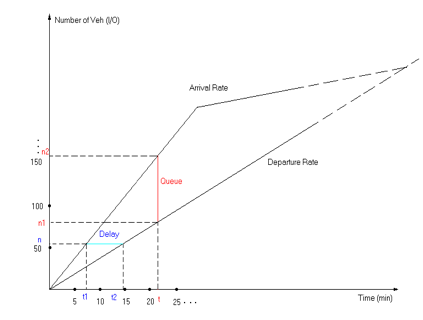
QueueingIO

A cumulative flow diagram is a tool used in queuing theory. It is an area graph that depicts the quantity of work in a given state, showing arrivals, time in queue, quantity in queue, and departure.

According to the Project Management Body of Knowledge (7th edition) by the Project Management Institute (PMI), Cumulative Flow Diagram (CFD) is a "chart indicating features completed over time, features in other states of development, and those in the backlog." The cumulative flow diagram can include intermediate features, such as those in design, quality assurance, or testing.

Cumulative flow diagrams are seen in the literature of agile software development and lean product development. They are also seen in transportation.

Some people consider a cumulative flow diagram to be a more sophisticated version of a "burn up chart", which is the opposite of a burn down chart. A burn down chart tracks work remaining over time while burn up charts like the CFD track the growth (or shrinkage) of work in certain states over time. In agile software development, when teams use kanban methodology, the cumulative flow diagram shows the number of active items in each column on a kanban board. The ideal cumulative flow diagram has each line in the cumulative flow diagram trends upwards constantly. With its focus on tracking changes in queue size per state, the CFD has a stronger focus on identifying and rooting out the causes of dramatic changes in throughput.

Another term is "cumulative input-output diagram". The term "Newell curve" is also used, in reference to Gordon F. Newell. It is not known if Newell originated the curve.
