= Chartered Financial Divorce Specialist =

Canadian professional designation

Chartered Financial Divorce Specialist (CFDS) is a Canadian professional designation that can be earned by eligible individuals holding a recognized financial designation (CFP, R.F.P., PFP, CLU, ChFC, CA, CMA, CIA, or CGA) and have completed specific training in the financial aspects of life transitions with respect to collaborative (mediated) cohabitation, marriage agreements, relationships or marital breakdowns (separation or divorce). It is based on professional best practice standards and a code of professional ethics, granted and monitored by the Academy of Financial Divorce Specialists in Ontario, Canada and other relevant licensing authorities.

CFDS professionals are required to possess a recognized financial or accounting designation or accreditation. Annual ongoing education is required to maintain the designation.

Adding financial expertise can simplify unrealistic expectations on the part of a separating couple which drive contested asset division. For example, by pointing out (with validated projections) that a couple will no longer be able to afford an asset they are arguing over, due to their decision to separate.

Lawyers can reduce their liability from financial advising without a recognized finance background, and make use of financial projections provided by the Chartered Financial Divorce Specialist. Divorce planners often conduct divorce mediation as well. Some lawyers state having a mediation process can prevent problems escalating and may be a point for rebuilding marriages troubled by 'financial infidelity.'. Mediation costs 3/4 what a court case would.

== History ==
The first American courses were originally developed by planner in Colorado, USA to educate other financial professionals on how they could help people going through separation, divorce and other life transitions. The training was based on her years of experience with clients, the legal community and mental health professionals. According to the Wall Street Journal, approximately 1,000 divorce planners had been certified in the United States by 1993.

In 1997, Linda Cartier was the first Canadian trained by Wilson.

The certified divorce planner designation started in the U.S. and was renamed "financial divorce specialist" in Canada to avoid confusion.

One of the first national financial services publications to write about it, Advisor's Edge magazine, reported the first Canadian training course was held at Toronto's Seneca College in June 2004.

CFDS accreditation has been developing since 2001. As of 2021, according to the Investment Industry Regulatory Organization of Canada members are required to have at least one certification from a list of financial specialties to qualify, which they listed as

- CFP - Certified Financial Planner (FP Canada)
- Fin. Pl. - Planificateur Financier (Institut québécois de planification financière (IQPF))
- R.F.P. - Registered Financial Planner (Institute of Advanced Financial Planners (IAFP))
- CIM - Chartered Investment Manager with proof of taking the fundamentals of Financial Planning (FOFP) course
- PFP - Personal Financial Planner, (Canadian Securities Institute)
- CLU - Chartered Life Underwriter (Institute for Advanced Financial Education / Advocis)
- CHFC - Chartered Financial Consultant (ChFC), from the Institute for Advanced Financial Education Canada
- CPA - Chartered Professional Accountant (CPA) (Including legacy designations of CA, CGA, and CMA)
- CIA - Certified Internal Auditor (Institute of Internal Auditors)
- QAFP - Qualified Associate Financial Planner (FP Canada)

The Chartered Financial Divorce Specialist designation is recognized by lawyers practicing collaborative law. Divorce planners cannot, legally, replace lawyers. Legal expertise is required by lawyers, who draft legal documents and deal with child custody matters. Divorce planners provide financial expertise in areas such as debt, budgeting, inheritances, retirement accounts, alimony payments, property, asset division and the related taxation effects.
