= Gordon F. Newell =

Gordon Frank Newell (January 25, 1925 – February 16, 2001) was an American scientist, known for his contributions to applied mathematics, in particular traffic flow analysis and queueing theory. Newell authored over one hundred articles and wrote several books. The Gordon–Newell theorem is named after him and his colleague William J. Gordon. Their algorithms helped form the basis of most modern automatically controlled and networked traffic-light control systems.

He obtained a B.Sc. from Union College, New York (1945) and a Ph.D. in physics from University of Illinois (1950). He continued his focus on solid-state physics and the Ising model of statistical mechanics with research teams under Elliott Montroll at University of Maryland, College Park (1950–53). His next job was at the applied mathematics faculty at Brown University (1953), where he began studies of automobile traffic analysis and road signalling theory. His final period was with the civil engineering faculty at University of California, Berkeley (1965–91), where he remained until retirement. He then held a professor emeritus of Transportation Engineering position. The annual Gordon Newell fellowship has been awarded since 2002.

He was born in Dayton, Ohio and raised in Rochester, New York. Newell died in an automobile accident in Carmel-by-the-Sea, California, after attending a party with friends.

== Books and publications ==
- Mathematical Models of Freely Flowing Traffic Flow. Operations Research, 3 (1955)
- Statistical Analysis of the Flow of Highway Traffic through a Signalized Intersection, in Q. Appl. Math. 13, 1956
- Maintaining a bus schedule, Proceedings of 2nd Australian Road Research Board, Part 1, pp. 388–393, 1964. With R. J. Potts
- Cyclic Queuing Systems with Restricted Length Queues, Op.res., Vol. 15, No. 2, March–April 1967, pp. 266–277. With William J. Gordon
- Applications of queueing theory (Chapman & Hall, 1971).
- Scheduling, Location, Transportation and Continuum Mechanics; Some Simple Approximations to Optimization Problems, in SIAM J. Appl. Math. 25, 1973
- Control of pairing of vehicles on a public transportation route, two vehicles, one control point, Transportation Science, Vol. 8, No. 3, pp. 248–264, 1974
- Traffic on Transportation Networks (MIT Press, 1980)
- Asymptotic Distribution of Eigenvalues for the Multidimensional Schroedinger Equation, in J. Math. Physics 21, 1980
- Theory of Highway Traffic Signals (Institute of Transportation Studies, 1988)
- Theory of Highway Traffic Flow, 1945–1965 (Inst. Trans. Studies, 1995)
