= Academician Pilyugin Center =

Subsidiary of Roscosmos

Coordinates: 55°38′44.99″N 37°33′6.98″E

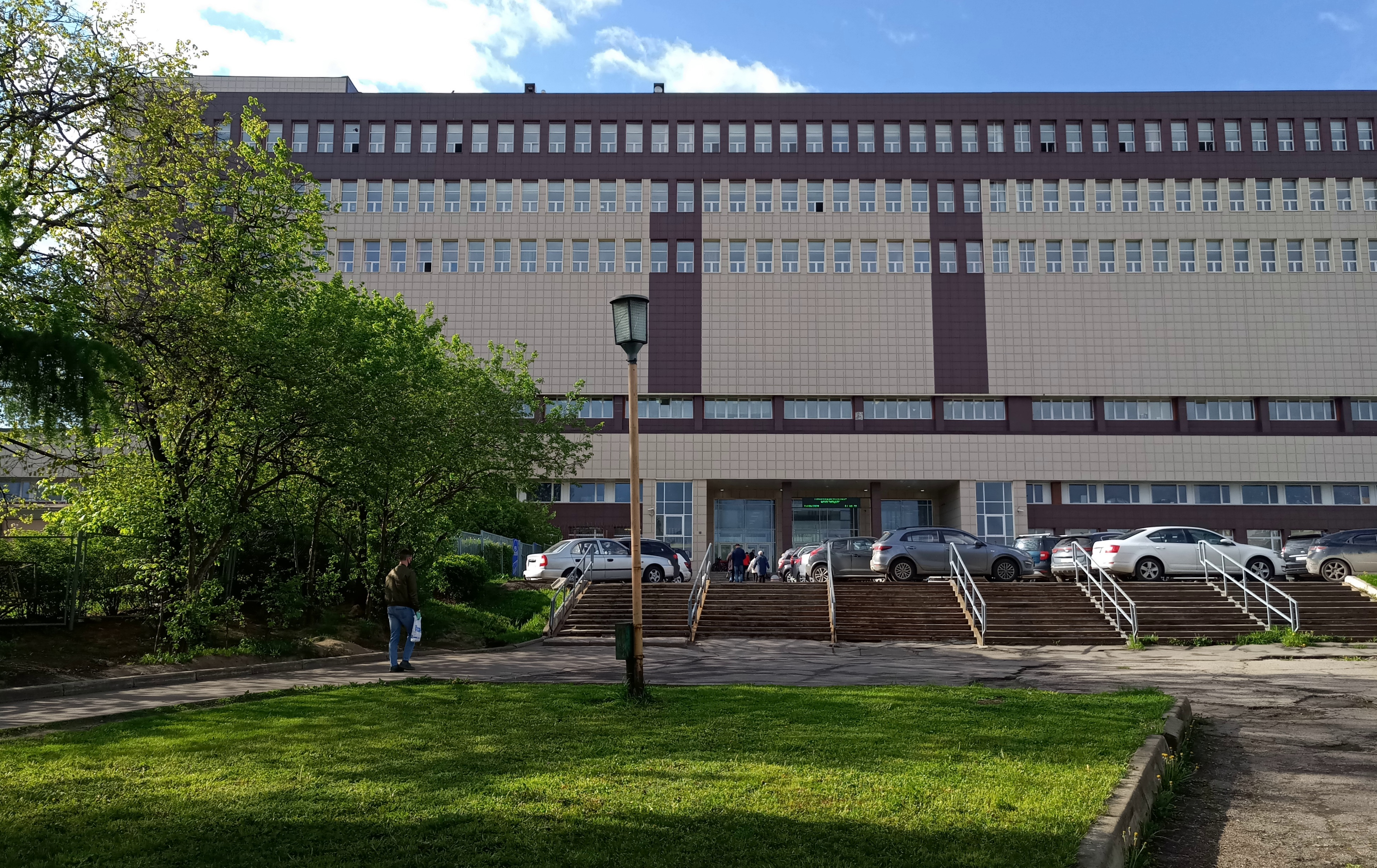
Academician Pilyugin Center

Scientific Production Association Of Automation And Instrument-Building (Russian: Научно-производственный центр автоматики и приборостроения), also known as the Academician Pilyugin Center, is a company based in Moscow, Russia. It is currently a Roscosmos subsidiary.

The Scientific Production Association of Automated Instruments develops guidance, navigation, and flight control systems for ballistic missiles, space launch vehicles, and spacecraft. It has produced systems for the Soyuz, Proton, N1, and Zenit launch vehicles; the Luna, Mars, Venera, and Vega probes; the Buran space shuttle; and the intercontinental ballistic missiles.

In 1997 it was named after Nikolay Pilyugin, the first director of the institute.
