= Taylor Corporation =

American printing company

- Company type: Private
- Industry: Printing
- Founded: 1975
- Headquarters: North Mankato, Minnesota, USA
- Key people: Glen Taylor, Chairman; Charles Whitaker, CEO
- Owner: Taylor Family
- Number of employees: 10,000

Taylor Corporation is a privately owned print and communications company headquartered in North Mankato, Minnesota, and was founded in 1975 by businessman Glen Taylor.

As of 2025, Taylor Corporation is considered the fifth largest graphic communications company in the country, with RR Donnelley and Quad/Graphics achieving larger revenues. The company holds more than 200 issued and pending patents.

== History ==
Taylor Corporation was founded in 1975 by Glen Taylor when he purchased Carlson Wedding Service located in North Mankato, Minnesota. Bill Carlson, the previous owner, had decided to sell the company in preparation for retirement. Taylor had worked for and alongside Carlson since 1959.

In 2020, Glen Taylor appointed Charlie Whitaker as the chief executive officer. Glen Taylor remains chairman of the company.

=== Taylor Corporation ===
Taylor Corporation has grown by acquiring more than 200 companies in the graphic arts industry since its inception in 1975.

One of the largest was its acquisition on June 17, 2015^{[3]}, of Standard Register Co., founded in Dayton, Ohio in 1912, for a reported $307 million. Brothers John and William Sherman, along with local Dayton inventor Theodore Shirmer, founded Standard Register Co. to sell the pinfeed autographic register, a device invented by Shirmer. The device enabled multiple copies of printed forms to be fed through the machine using a hand-cranked wooden cylinder. Over the next century, Standard Register rose to prominence as one of the largest printed communications companies in the United States.

Several months after the transaction was complete, Standard Register was re-branded as Taylor Corporation. Less than one year following the acquisition of Standard Register, Taylor Corporation announced its intentions to purchase Staples Print Solutions, the commercial print division of Staples Inc. The acquisition added 10 commercial print facilities to the company's manufacturing footprint.

Another significant acquisition was Curtis 1000, founded in St. Paul, Minnesota, in 1882 by Henry Russell Curtis. Curtis Printing Company was incorporated on September 9, 1886, and grew to become a leading provider of direct mail, labels, promotional products and other printed items for the financial industry. Taylor acquired Curtis 1000, Inc. in 2002.

In 2021, the business discontinued using the Curtis 1000 brand name and now refers to this part of its business as Taylor.

=== Elections ===
Taylor prints ballots for Maryland and Clark County, NV.
