= Benjamin S. Graham =

American organizational theorist

Benjamin S. Graham Sr. (1900–1960) was an American organizational theorist and consultant known as a pioneer in the development and application of scientific management and industrial engineering techniques to the office and factory clerical work. He is recognized as the founder of paperwork simplification. He saw a growing need for improvement in information processing back in the 1940s (when the professional and clerical segments of the workforce were still in the minority).

== Biography ==
Graham started his career in the insurance business. In the 1940s he was trained in work simplification by Allan H. Mogensen and Lillian Gilbreth, which had started at the 1944 Work Simplification Conferences at Lake Placid, where he participated in Mogensen's class.

Graham also participated in the programs of the Work Simplification Round Tables at New York University, the spring Methods Conferences conducted by the Wharton School of Finance at the University of Pennsylvania and at UCLA’s Engineering and Management Course. MIT, Northwestern University, Cornell and Georgia are among other colleges that called upon Mr. Graham throughout his career.

Graham organized and directed the Paperwork Simplification Conferences held at Madison, Wisconsin in the spring and fall, at the Seigniory Club, Quebec, Canada in the spring and at the University of Dayton, Ohio in the fall. He conducted many sold-out public training workshops between 1953 and 1959 along with numerous in-house workshops for organizations in the US, Canada, and South America. He also conducted hundreds of speaking engagements to professional societies. Ben S. Graham, Sr. died in 1960 at the age of 59.

== Work ==
Graham had adapted the Gilbreth flow process charts that were being used to improve factory work for use with more complex business processes. He was working with the Standard Register Company of Dayton, Ohio. His purpose was to display processes so that employee teams could study them and streamline them. Graham was invited to join Mogensen’s staff to provide instruction in paperwork simplification at Mogensen’s Work Simplification Conferences.

Graham was a prolific author with articles on Work Simplification and Management Methods, particularly as applied to office and paperwork, that appeared in Fortune, Industrial Engineering Magazine and a great variety of professional and other journals here and abroad. Standard Register published a collection of his articles that appeared in their PS magazine called Paperwork Simplification for Better Management Control.

His process-charting technique is now used worldwide for Business Process Improvement.

== Selected publications ==
- Graham, Ben S. "Paperwork Simplification." Industrial Management Institute (1950).
