= List of BPMN 2.0 engines =

This is a list of notable Business Process Model and Notation 2.0 (BPMN 2.0) Workflow Management Systems (WfMSs).

== List of BPMN 2.0 engines ==
Product Name	Version	Release Date	BPMN 2.0 Core Support (Note: Documentation of the engines' compliance with BPMN 2.0 is missing.)	Deployable Process Definition Language	Framework	First BPMN 2.0 Release Date (Note: Release date of the first version of the product supporting BPMN 2.0.)	License
ActiveVOS	9.2.4.6	2020/03/18	?	BPMN 2.0, WS-BPEL 2.0	Java EE	2009	Proprietary
Activiti	8.2.0	2024/01/22	?	BPMN 2.0	Java	1 August 2010	Apache Software License 2.0
Bizagi BPM Suite	11.0	2016/08	?	BPMN 2.0	Java EE and .NET	December 2011	Proprietary
Bonita BPM	2021.1	2021/01/28	?	BPMN 2.0	Java	2011	LGPL v2, GPL v2, Proprietary
Camunda BPM	7.17.0	2022/04/12	Yes	BPMN 2.0	Java	2013	Apache Software License 2.0
Flowable	6.8.0	2022/12/22	yes	BPMN 2.0	Java, Spring	2010	Apache Software License 2.0
Imixs-Workflow	6.0.6	2024/06/06	yes	BPMN 2.0	Java EE	12 April 2015	GPL 2.0
jBPM	7.74.1	2023/07/19	yes	BPMN 2.0	Java, Java EE, Spring	28 December 2013	Apache Software License 2.0
Orchestra	4.9.0	2012/01	?	BPMN 2.0, (Note: There is a BPMN 2.0 Designer.) WS-BPEL 2.0	Apache Axis, Apache CXF, OSGi, Java EE	June, 2011	LGPL
Sydle SEED	10.04	2014/07	?	BPMN 2.0	Java on Cloud	July, 2013	Cloud-based

Legend of Colours and Symbols Used in Cells
? No reliable source found

== See also ==
- Comparison of Business Process Modeling Notation tools
- List of BPEL engines
