= List of BPEL engines =

This is a list of notable Business Process Execution Language (BPEL) and Business Process Model and Notation (BPMN) engines.

| Product | Vendor | Edition | Release date | Framework | Compatibility | License |
|---|---|---|---|---|---|---|
| ActiveVOS | Active Endpoints | 8.0 | 2010–09 | Servlet or Java EE | BPMN 2.0; WS-BPEL | Proprietary |
| Activiti | Alfresco and the Activiti community | 5.16.4 | 2014-10-16 | Java | BPMN 2.0 | Apache 2.0 |
| ExpressBPEL-BPM | CodeBrew | 3.0 (SAAS Edition) | 2013-12-16 | Java/ApacheAxis/Cassandra/Ignite | WS-BPEL 2.0/HumanTask | Proprietary |
| Apache ODE | ASF | 1.3.7; 1.0.164 | 2016-11-10; 2006-06-07 | Apache Axis, JBI; Java EE | BPEL4WS 1.1, WS-BPEL 2.0; WS-HumanTask with Apache HISE | Apache 2.0 |
| BizTalk Server | Microsoft | Biztalk 2010 | 2010 | .NET | BPEL, BPMN, RFID, WSDL, UDDI, WS-*, ... | Proprietary |
| Imixs-Workflow | Imixs | 3.2.0 | 2015-04-05 | Java EE | BPMN 2.0 | GPL 2.0 |
| InterSystems IRIS | InterSystems | All versions | 2018-01-01 | BPL | BPEL | Proprietary free and commercial licenses (subscription, purchase) |
| jBPM | jBoss | 6.4.0 | 2016-03-23 | Java EE | BPMN 2.0 | Apache 2.0 |
| Open ESB | OpenESB Community | 2.3.1 | 2013-10-01 | Java EE, JBI | WS-BPEL 2.0 | CDDL |
| Oracle BPEL Process Manager (formerly Collaxa BPEL Orchestration Server) | Oracle Corporation | 11g | 2010–04 | Java EE | WS-BPEL 2.0, BPMN 2.0 | Proprietary |
| OW2 Orchestra | OW2 | 4.9.0 | 2012-01-23 | Apache Axis; Apache CXF; OSGi; Java EE | WS-BPEL 2.0 | LGPL |
| Petals BPEL Engine | Petals Link | 1.0.1 | 2009-12-08 | Java EE | WS-BPEL 2.0, WSDL 1.1 and 2.0 | LGPL |
| SAP Exchange Infrastructure | SAP AG | 3.0 | | | BPEL | Proprietary |
| Virtuoso Universal Server | OpenLink Software | 4.5 | 2006 | | UDDI, WS-BPEL, WS-* | GPL and Proprietary |
| WebSphere Process Server | IBM | 6.0.1.3 | 2006-09-29 | Java EE | WS-BPEL | Proprietary |

== See also ==
- Business Process Execution Language
- Comparison of business integration software
- List of BPMN 2.0 Engines
