= Hydra OMS =

- Developer: Latera LLC
- Initial release: 2016
- Repository: github.com/joergen7/cuneiform
- Written in: Ruby, JavaScript
- Available in: English, Russian
- Type: open source OMS software
- License: Apache 2.0
- Website: www.hydra-oms.com

Hydra OMS is an open-source order management system and workflow suite for managing service/job orders and business processes. It is intended for use in companies and automates their complex and/or frequently changing business processes. Hydra OMS allows companies to automate their order execution, build business process models with ISO standardized BPMN 2.0 and provide employees with a user-friendly order execution wizard. Hydra OMS can be integrated with third-party software.

== Features ==
Hydra OMS internally consists of:

- PostgreSQL for data keeping
- Activiti open source BPM system
- Ruby on Rails was chosen as the wizard interface of process implementation and REST API

Hydra OMS is open-source and can be downloaded under Apache License 2.0: https://github.com/latera/homs

== Applications ==
Hydra OMS can be applied for managing typical tasks and providing recurring services are often complex business processes that require cooperation from several departments like that: new customer connection/provisioning, on-premises equipment installation, service and replacement, returning (for goods), claim management etc.

== See also ==
- Business process modeling
- Business Process Model and Notation
