= BWL =

The acronym BWL means:

- U.S. Army Biological Warfare Laboratories
- British Workers League
- Birch Wathen Lenox School in New York City
- Lambert, W. G., Babylonian Wisdom Literature, sometimes cited in academic papers on the Book of Job
- ICAO airline code for defunct airline British World Airlines
- IBM Blueworks Live - a business process modelling tool sold by IBM
- Lansing Board of Water & Light, public utility in Lansing, Michigan
- The Batman Who Laughs, fictional DC supervillain
