= Micros Systems =

American technology company

Micros Systems, Inc.
- Type: Subsidiary
- Traded as: Nasdaq: MCRS
- Industry: Hospitality support, Computer hardware
- Founded: 1977; 49 years ago
- Defunct: 2014; 12 years ago
- Fate: acquired by Oracle Corporation
- Headquarters: Columbia, Maryland, United States
- Key people: Tom Gianopolous (president & CEO)
- Products: Point of sale systems Property management systems Workflow application
- Revenue: ▲US$1,007.9M (FY11; 10.2% increase from FY10)
- Number of employees: ~4953 (2011)
- Parent: Oracle Corporation
- Website: www.micros.com

Micros Systems, Inc. was an American computer company that manufactured hardware and developed software and services for the restaurant point of sale, hotel, hospitality, sports and entertainment venues, casinos, cruise lines, specialty retail markets, and other similar markets. Analyst estimates cited in 2003 put Micros' market share at about 35% of the restaurant point-of-sale business. Independently active from 1978 to 2014, Micros is now owned by Oracle Corporation and renamed Oracle Food and Beverage and Oracle Hospitality (two of the global business units at Oracle Corporation). Micros was headquartered in Columbia, Maryland, United States, and the current business unit is still based there.

On June 23, 2014, Oracle Corporation announced its intent to purchase Micros Systems for $68 per share in cash for a total value of approximately $5.3 billion.

== History ==
The company was incorporated in 1977 as Picos Manufacturing, Inc. and changed its name to Micros Systems, Inc. in 1978. Micros Systems, Inc. was headquartered in Columbia, Maryland. The name Micros is an acronym for Modular Integrated Cash Register Operating Systems.

=== Products ===
Oracle offers multiple products under the Micros name. Oracle Micros Simphony is a cloud-based restaurant POS system. Opera is the Micros property management system used in many large hotel chains, such as Accor Hotels, Meliá Hotels International, Four Seasons Hotels and Resorts, Travelodge Hotels UK, Crown Resorts, Hyatt Hotels and Resorts, Rydges Hotels & Resorts, Indian Hotels Company Limited (IHCL), Oberoi Hotels & Resorts, Jupiter Hotels, Marriott Hotels & Resorts, Starwood Hotels and Resorts, Resorts and Suites, Radisson Hotels and Resorts (subsidiary of Carlson Companies), the InterContinental Hotels Group and the Thistle Hotels.

With the purchase of the company Torex from Cerberus Capital Management, Micros acquired MiRetail Hub, a Workflow application written using Windows Workflow Foundation and designed for the Retail market.

== Subsidiaries ==
Subsidiary	Acquired	Products	Ref.
Torex	September 2012	Till systems in the UK	
Snow Valley	April 2011	e-commerce solutions for retail and hospitality	
TIG Global	January 2010	specializes in hotel Internet marketing and destination Internet marketing	
Fry	August 2008	strategy and marketing through design, development, managed services and fulfillment; development of e-commerce applications	
Micros-Retail	January 2008	combining the subsidiaries: Datavantage, CommercialWare and eOne Group	
CommercialWare	February 2006	cross-channel commerce infrastructure solutions: point-of-sale, back-office, order management, fulfillment, customer service, collaboration, and analytics applications	
JTECH Communications	January 2005	on-premises wireless messaging systems (pagers) for the retail, hospitality and healthcare industries	
Datavantage	May 2003	information technology solutions for the specialty and general merchandise retail industry, analytic solutions	
Indatec (German)	January 2001	point-of-sale terminals, peripherals and associated software for independent restaurants and other catering facilities	
Hospitality Solutions International	November 2000	point-of-service and enterprise systems for restaurants, hotel management software	
Micros Fidelio Germany	November 1995	property-management systems (PMSs), hotel computer information systems	
Micros Fidelio Nordic	November 1995	property-management systems (PMSs), hotel computer information systems	
Micros Fidelio UK Ltd	November 1995	property-management systems (PMSs), hotel computer information systems	
Micros-Fidelio Asia Pacific	November 1995	property-management systems (PMSs), hotel computer information systems	
Fidelio Cruise	November 1995	property-management systems (PMSs), hotel computer information systems	
