= Camunda =

Open-source workflow software

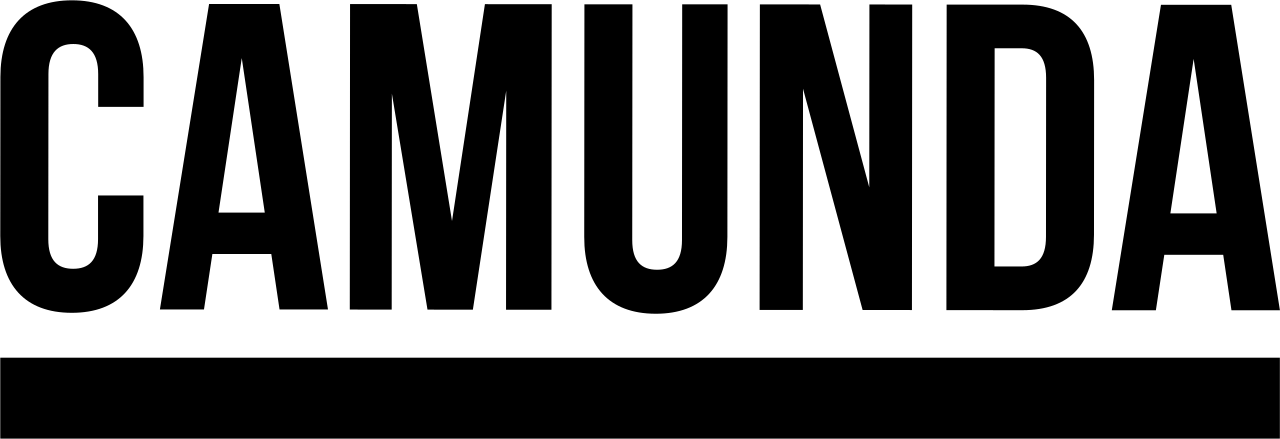
- Original author: Camunda
- Developer: Camunda Services GmbH
- Release: August 31, 2013; 13 years ago
- Stable release: 8.9.0 / 14 April 2026; 6 months ago
- Written in: Java
- Operating system: Cross-platform
- Type: Workflow and decision automation
- License: Apache License 2.0
- Website: camunda.com
- Repository: github.com/orgs/camunda/repositories

Camunda is a process orchestration and automation platform used to design, execute, and control complex business processes for enterprise companies. The software is classified by specialist media as a business process automation tool or digital process automation software, or business orchestration and automation technology (BOAT) as classified by Gartner or digital process automation software and therefore represents a further development of the classic workflow management platform. Camunda focuses on the automation of end-to-end business processes.

The company name is a portmanteau of ‘capere’ (Latin for ‘to understand’) and “munda” (Latin for ‘clean’). According to the company, it is intended to express its aspiration to make the world a better place through understanding.

== Overview ==
Process orchestration is the main topic at the biannual CamundaCon (formerly BPM Con)^{[6]}, which is organized by Camunda. Other conferences such as JAX (and W-JAX) or Devoxx are also regularly dedicated to the topic.

== History ==
Camunda 7 is an originally commercial workflow management system, which was based on Activiti, a free business process management system. Alongside Alfresco, Camunda was one of the biggest contributors of Activiti.

On 18 March 2013, the further development of Camunda was spun off from the development of Activiti.

In December 2018, Camunda received €25 million in Series A funding from Highland Europe.

In March 2021, Camunda raised €82 million in a Series B funding round led by Insight Partners together with Series A investors Highland Europe.

In April 2022, Camunda released Camunda Platform 8 (now Camunda 8) as a successor to Camunda Cloud, incorporating the cloud-native workflow and decision engine Zeebe.

In May 2024, Camunda began integrating generative AI capabilities into its platform as part of a new feature suite called Camunda Copilot. This includes process modeling suggestions and a form builder that creates forms based on human prompts. It also provides connectors for integrating AI endpoints (e.g., OpenAI, Azure OpenAI, Hugging Face) into processes.

Since October 2024, Camunda has released all components of the distribution, including Zeebe, Operate, Tasklist, Optimize, and Identity, under a single license. This license allows free use for development and testing purposes, but requires a production license for deployment. Furthermore, the new license provides free access to the Web Modeler for up to five users. In October 2024, SAP integration and the integration of task automation capabilities, including Robotic Process Automation (RPA) and Intelligent Document Processing (IDP), were announced.

Camunda was included in Viva Technology's "Top 100 next unicorns" list in 2023 and 2024.

In 2024, Camunda achieved revenues of over 100 million euros.

== Features ==
Camunda consists of a number of components and applications that are used together to define and execute business processes:

The Camunda Modeler desktop application and web modeler allow developers to create and edit BPMN process diagrams and DMN decision tables.

External endpoints can be integrated into processes via Connectors, which are pre-built and customizable packages consisting of BPMN-elements and API templates. With the release of Camunda 8.3, Camunda Marketplace was added, allowing users to share and download additional Connectors for various business systems.

Created files are deployed in the Camunda Engines, which use a BPMN parser to transform BPMN 2.0 XML files, and DMN XML files, into Java objects, and implements BPMN 2.0 constructs with a set of BPMN Behavior implementations.

Typical use cases for the Camunda BPMN Workflow Engine can be microservices orchestration and human task management.

The Camunda DMN Decision Engine executes business-driven decision tables. It is pre-integrated with the Workflow Engine but can be used as a stand-alone application via REST or inside Java applications.

Camunda's additional web applications provide the following tools for developers and business users:

- Operate: A tool for technical process operations enabling users to monitor workflows and decisions in production, to analyze and solve technical problems.
- Tasklist: Allows end users to work on assigned tasks and provides additional visibility when using the Camunda Workflow Engine for human task management.
- Optimize: An analytics and reporting tool to identify errors and bottlenecks in workflow processes.
- Modeler: A collaborative modeling tool allowing multiple users to create, edit and specify BPMN process diagrams.
- Console: Allows users to manage Camunda web applications or REST API users. Existing user management can be integrated via LDAP.

== Architecture ==
Camunda Platform is a lightweight, Java-based framework. It can be used as a standalone process engine server or embedded inside custom Java applications. It offers non-Java developers a REST API and dedicated client libraries to build applications connecting to a remote workflow engine.
