= Flowable =

Open-source workflow engine

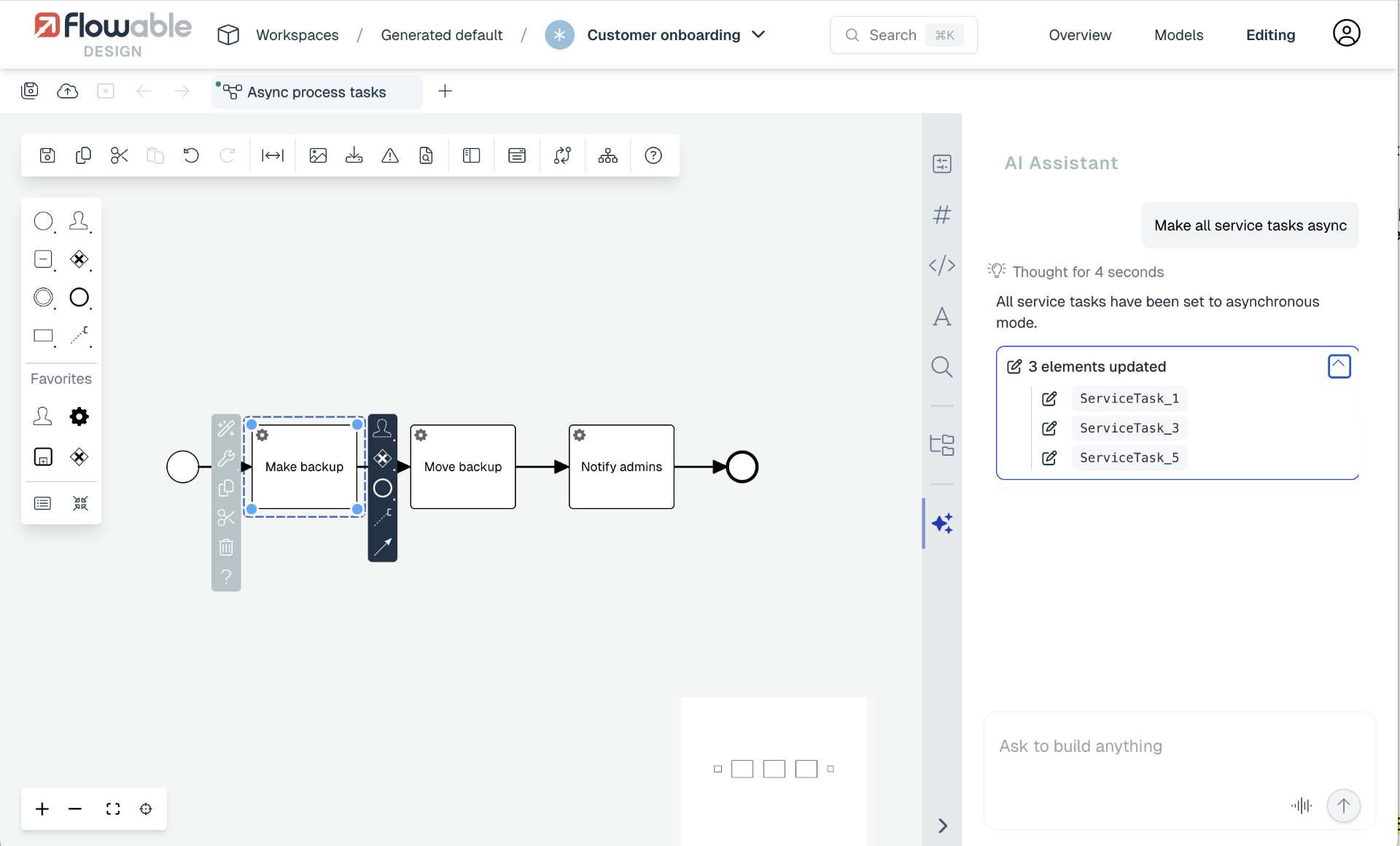
- Flowable Design process modeling example
- Developer: Flowable AG
- Stable release: 2025.2 / 17 December 2025
- Written in: Java, JavaScript
- Operating system: Cross-platform
- Type: Business process management, Workflow, Orchestration
- Licence: Apache License 2.0
- Website: www.flowable.com
- Repository: github.com/flowable/flowable-engine

Flowable is a Swiss business process automation (BPA) and workflow orchestration platform that provides open-source and enterprise software solutions. It provides software for modeling, executing, and monitoring structured and adaptive business processes, cases, and workflows based on open standards, including BPMN 2.0 (Business Process Model and Notation), CMMN (Case Management Model and Notation), and DMN (Decision Model and Notation). The platform is used across multiple sectors, including regulated sectors such as finance, healthcare, and government for process and service orchestration.

== History ==
In October 2016, the lead developers of Activiti (software) left Alfresco (software) and started the Flowable Open Source project based on a fork of Activiti code.

The first version of Flowable was 5.22, based on a fork of Activiti 5.21, but added Transient Variables. The first release of Flowable version 6.0 was based on a fork of Activiti version 6 beta 4. Version 6 of the Flowable engine includes a rewrite of the core process virtual machine.

== Architecture ==
Flowable has a modular, model-driven platform for business process and case automation that supports both low-code and traditional code development. Its architecture centers on runtime engines that execute workflow, case, and decision models defined using open standards.These engines can be embedded within Java applications or deployed as standalone services, and are typically accessed through Java or REST‑based APIs.

In addition to its core execution engines, the platform includes supporting components for model design, identity management, deployment, and operational monitoring. It supports both code‑centric and low‑code development approaches, allowing automation logic to be expressed programmatically or through graphical models, depending on the use case and deployment context.

The platform comprises:

- Flowable Work: A low-code platform for managing structured workflows and tasks, providing features for process design, task management, and integration with external systems.
- Flowable Design: The central modeling environment for creating process, case, decision, and form models. It supports drag-and-drop interfaces, reusable templates, and Git-based versioning.
- Flowable AI Studio: A separately licensed module for AI-assisted automation and agent-based orchestration. Key features include:
  - Multi-agent orchestration: It includes a dedicated agent engine that operates alongside BPMN and CMMN engines to manage specialized agents for tasks such as documentation, verification, and decision-making.
  - LLM and RAG integration: Supports integration with commercial and private large language models (LLMs) and Retrieval-Augmented Generation (RAG) for information retrieval within workflows.
  - Generative modeling: Provides functionality for creating workflows and forms from natural language input.
  - Content analysis: Agents are used for tasks such as document summarization, sentiment analysis, and data extraction from unstructured documents.
  - Audit and governance: Includes audit logs and governance mechanisms that record agent actions and automated decisions.
- Flowable Control: A tool for monitoring and managing Flowable’s process and case engines. It provides tools to identify issues, correct case data, and maintain process execution. You also get detailed runtime engine insights for troubleshooting and performance monitoring.
- Flowable Hub: The central management application in Flowable Cloud, organized into Management and Environment areas. It lets you configure users and permissions, manage runtime environments, deploy applications, and review runtime or historical data, similar to Flowable Control for on-premise deployments.

== Agent-based automation and AI capabilities ==
Flowable added AI‑assisted automation capabilities, reflecting a broader shift in business process platforms toward agent‑based and adaptive automation known as an Agentic Case Platform. This means integrating AI agents directly into BPMN and CMMN workflows. Collaboration between human users, traditional systems, and AI agents is a result of this approach. Supported capabilities include:

- Specialized agent types such as:
  - Document agents for data extraction and classification.
  - Knowledge agents for RAG-based querying.
  - Orchestration agents for coordinating other agents and guiding process flow.
- Governance and auditability of agent actions.
- Orchestration of processes and cases using BPMN and CMMN models.

== Recent development ==
- Flowable 2025.1 Release: Introduced a dedicated agent engine alongside the BPMN and CMMN engines, supporting multi-agent collaboration, external agent orchestration, and AI-assisted case views.
- Flowable 2025.2 Release: Expanded governed agentic automation with enterprise‑grade multi‑agent orchestration, A2A‑compatible external agent support, and enhanced AI Studio capabilities, adding deep runtime visibility, AI-assisted design and modeling, and stronger governance for regulated environments.
- Industry recognition: Featured in the 2025 Gartner® Business Orchestration and Automation Technologies report (BOAT) and Forrester Wave™ for Digital Process Automation (DPA), recognized for orchestration precision and governance-first AI capabilities.
- Enterprise adoption: Reported adoption includes organizations such as UBS and Deutsche Post for document processing and workflow management.
