= ADOIT =

Enterprise architecture management tool

ADOIT is an enterprise architecture management tool that provides functionality and methods for enterprise analysis, design, planning, and implementation. The platform supports alignment and improvement of dependencies between business and IT as well as manages and analyses the dependencies between different organizational assets. The EA suite ADOIT is based on various international standards, including TOGAF, ArchiMate, ITIL, and COBIT. The suite is ArchiMate 3.1 and TOGAF-9 certified. Developed by the BOC Group, ADOIT represents the company's second flagship product along with their business process management and analysis tool, ADONIS NP.

== History ==
The first version of ADOIT was introduced in 2003 by the BOC Group.

In 2013, ADOIT was additionally made available as ADOIT Community Edition freemium.

In January 2022, ADOIT 14.0 was released and is currently the latest version available.

== Application scenarios and features ==
ADOIT is a tool designed to optimize enterprise architectures. It covers a wide application field from the establishment of EA know-how, the definition and implementation of architectural principles, the establishment of business capability management, installation of compliance and IT risk management, to the integration of process management initiatives.

The tool provides options for role-based access, automated and user-specific notifications and warnings, team collaboration, as well as tailored views and reports. The EA suite can be integrated with other tools and technologies such as the BPM suite ADONIS, ServiceNow Live Connector, and others. ADOIT also has a HTML 5 based web client.
