= Workflow application =

Software category

A workflow application is a software application that automates, to at least some degree, a process or processes. The processes are usually business-related but can be any process that requires a series of steps to be automated via software. Some steps of the process may require human intervention, such as approval or the development of custom text, but functions that can be automated should be handled by the application. Advanced applications allow users to introduce new components into the operation.

For example, consider a purchase order that moves through various departments for authorization and eventual purchase. The order may be automatically routed from one department to another for approval. Once all necessary authorizations are obtained, the requester of the purchase order is notified and granted the necessary authorization. A workflow process may involve frequent maintenance. For example, the usual approver of purchase orders may be on vacation, in which case, the application will request approval from alternative approvers.

== Development ==
Workflow applications can be developed using a graphical designer, a programming language, or a combination of both.

Some software products provide a means to create workflow applications with a diagram-based graphical designer alone. These types of systems rely on the ability to capture all relevant information for the workflow process through a specialized interface aimed at non-programmers. Subsequently, the software compiles that information into a functional workflow application. However, there are instances when the use of a programming language becomes necessary, particularly for incorporating more complex rules into the workflow, such as calculations for validating data in input forms.

For code-based workflow design, workflow applications can be developed with any general-purpose programming language, but specialized workflow languages also exist. These languages usually come with an associated graphical notation (such as BPMN), although some are textual or XML-based. Examples of specialized languages that can be used for workflow definition in this manner include:

- XPDL
- YAWL (Yet Another Workflow Language)
- SCUFL (Simple Conceptual Unified Flow Language)

The above languages are based on XML syntax and while suitable for manipulation by software, they may be difficult for non-technical people to work with. Therefore, their use is generally augmented by graphical notations enabling the creation of flowchart-like diagrams that are easier for people to develop and interpret: creating such diagrams is in effect a form of "graphical" programming. The software package that allows a user to develop a workflow diagram will typically translate a diagram into its XML equivalent.

Another approach to developing workflow applications is to use a programming language in conjunction with libraries and interfaces that capture abstractions for task coordination. The following are examples of such libraries and interfaces:

- Windows Workflow Foundation (WF)
- Workflow OSID

The use of libraries is generally complementary to diagramming techniques, which are not always sufficient by themselves to create fully functional applications (unless the diagramming tool is part of a specific workflow management system). WF workflows, for example, can be created using Microsoft Visual Studio diagrammatically (their XML equivalent is XAML), and their functionality can be augmented with code written in C# or VB.NET: a given workflow can be called by an existing software application as a Web service. Software development tools such as Visual Studio or the numerous coding environments for Java will also allow particular components to be designed entirely in code and then used as building blocks in workflow diagrams after they are compiled.

One limitation of certain purely diagram-based techniques, such as BPMN mentioned above, is that to fit the purpose of workflow specification, such notations need to be enhanced with additional constructs. These constructs capture data passing, data transformations and routing conditions, to bind tasks to their implementation, etc. BPMN, while intended to serve as a standard, is deficient in this regard. Several commercial packages (such as Microsoft Biztalk) address these needs in proprietary ways (specifically, by enhancing the basic set of diagramming icons with additional icons that support the needed functionality).

For the purpose of static analysis, e.g. to detect semantic errors at design time, it is also possible to represent workflow in a mathematical form using a formal notation such as Petri nets.
