= ADONIS (software) =

Business process analysis tool

ADONIS is a Business Process Management (BPM) tool, used for documentation, analysis, and optimization of business processes. It enables the visualization of process flows and standard operating procedures (SOPs), provides visibility into how they operate, and helps increase their efficiency by revealing redundant efforts and opportunities for improvement.

The ADONIS BPM suite is manufactured and marketed by BOC Group and represents their flagship Business Process Management product.

== Overview ==
ADONIS is designed as a golden source of organizations' process data, and thus supports the end-to-end management and improvement of their business processes. It is an HTML 5 web-based application, fully BPMN 2.0 compliant, and conformant with various other international standards and best practices such as BPMM, DMN and ISO 9000.

== Capabilities and Application Scenarios ==
The tool covers a wide application field and assists its users in the following domains:

- Process Management
- Quality Management & Operational Excellence
- Digitalization and Automation
- Customer Journey Mapping and Ideation
- Audit and Compliance
- SAP/ERP Integration

ADONIS provides an array of different functionalities, including, but not limited to business process modelling using the BPMN notation, graphical analysis and reporting capabilities, process simulation and data-driven insights, process versioning, publishing and team collaboration, as well as process automation using BPMN 2.0 XML (BPMN DI) and XPDL2.

In addition to its out-of-the-box features, ADONIS offers different configuration and customization possibilities, and can be integrated with other tools via the RESTful API interface. Some of the common integration scenarios include the Enterprise Architecture suite ADOIT, Atlassian Confluence, SAP Solution Manager and others.

== History ==
ADONIS was first released in 1995 by the BPMS Group (Business Process Management Systems) at the Computer Science and Business Informatics Institute of the University of Vienna, which later evolved into the company BOC Group as its spin-off. Since then, ADONIS has been continuously advanced, and is currently available in its latest version ADONIS 13.0, released in December 2021.

In addition to its commercial editions (Enterprise Edition and Starter Edition), in 2008 ADONIS became one of the first BPM tools to release a Community Edition freeware (ADONIS:Community Edition) which now counts over 200.000 registered community users.

== Awards and Recognitions ==
1. Recognized as a 2021 Customers' Choice Tool in the Gartner Voice of The Customer (EBPA) market report
2. Featured in the 2021 Gartner Market Guide for Enterprise Business Process Analysis (EBPA) report
3. Featured in the 2021 Gartner Market Guide for Technologies Supporting a Digital Twin of an Organization report
4. Certified for accessibility by BIK Hamburg
5. Certified SaaS for ISO 27000
6. Listed as a top performer for interoperability of BPM tools
7. OMG Award 2008 "Best BPM Application Using Standards"
