= Advanced case management =

Advanced case management (ACM), also known as dynamic case management or adaptive case management, refers to the coordination of a service request in finance, health, legal, citizen, or human resources-related matters, on behalf of a subject such as a customer, a citizen, or an employee. According to British company Insight 2 Value, ACM "offers the ability to monitor, update, understand and interpret every piece of work as it is processed, enhancing both efficiency and security and providing a smarter, more integrated way to handle increasingly complex caseloads and shrinking resources."

== Social services ==
In Advanced Case Management: New Strategies for the Nineties, Norma Radol Raiff describes the history of case management in social work. She views case management in social work as "an intervention with roots in the professional's value base, including its hallowed principle of respect for the individual, client self-determination, and equal access to resources."

Raiff writes that "based on a computerized literature review and analysis of existing models, we propose that a program or practice may be characterized as 'advanced' if it displays innovative behavior on five possible dimensions: client, practitioner, organization, model of service delivery, and/or attention to 'quality assurance'."

== Business models ==
The concept of ACM has been embraced by large corporations such as IBM, and is most simply defined as a comprehensive strategy that approaches cases from every possible angle, simultaneously emphasizing the importance of integration in meeting the needs of a client – also known as management from 360 degrees. The Baltimore-based company Social Solutions concludes that "Advanced Case Management, rather than being a new technology, is actually just a new way of thinking about how the technology we use integrates with the services we provide."

The tasks required by a case usually involve creating a case folder or container for all required artifacts. Another important step in the processing of a case involves following business procedures, both determined and ad hoc, ensuring the delivery of the service. Due to the dynamic and unique nature of each case, the requested services usually require collaboration with other specialized workers both inside and outside of the servicing organization. When combined, case management is highly collaborative, dynamic, and contextual in nature, with events driving a long lived case-based business process. Aggregating many cases with a semblance of consistency, insight, and optimization becomes a challenging effort for both the case worker and the organization.

=== Services ===
Advanced case management uses multiple services, including content management, business process management, business rules management, analytics, business monitoring, collaboration, integration, document capture, document creation, and case design.

=== Industry standards ===
In May 2014 the Object Management Group (OMG) ratified a standard for Case Management that is similar to existing standards for Business Process Management. The CMMN standard describes a graphical representation for expressing a Case, as well as an interchange format for exchanging Case models among different tools.
