= Apache Airflow =

Open-source workflow management platform

- Original author: Maxime Beauchemin / Airbnb
- Developer: Apache Software Foundation
- Release: June 3, 2015; 11 years ago
- Stable release: 3.3.0 (6 July 2026; 2 months ago) [±]
- Written in: Python
- Operating system: Linux, macOS
- Type: Workflow management platform
- License: Apache License 2.0
- Website: airflow.apache.org
- Repository: github.com/apache/airflow

Apache Airflow is an open-source workflow management platform for data engineering pipelines. It started at Airbnb in October 2014 as a solution to manage the company's increasingly complex workflows. Creating Airflow allowed Airbnb to programmatically author and schedule their workflows and monitor them via the built-in Airflow user interface. From the beginning, the project was made open source, becoming an Apache Incubator project in March 2016 and a top-level Apache Software Foundation project in January 2019.

Airflow is written in Python, and workflows are created via Python scripts. Airflow is designed under the principle of "configuration as code". While other "configuration as code" workflow platforms exist using markup languages like XML, using Python allows developers to import libraries and classes to help them create their workflows.

According to VentureBeat in 2025, Airflow is the de facto tool for data engineering and has been adopted by Fortune 500 companies.

== Overview ==
Airflow uses directed acyclic graphs (DAGs) to manage workflow orchestration. Tasks and dependencies are defined in Python and then Airflow manages the scheduling and execution. DAGs can be run either on a defined schedule (e.g. hourly or daily) or based on external event triggers (e.g. a file appearing in Hive). Previous DAG-based schedulers like Oozie and Azkaban tended to rely on multiple configuration files and file system trees to create a DAG, whereas in Airflow, DAGs can often be written in one Python file.

== Managed providers ==
Several vendors offer managed Apache Airflow services. Examples include Microsoft Azure Apache Airflow Job, Google Cloud Composer, and Amazon Managed Workflows for Apache Airflow (MWAA).
