= Devoxx =

Developers community conference series

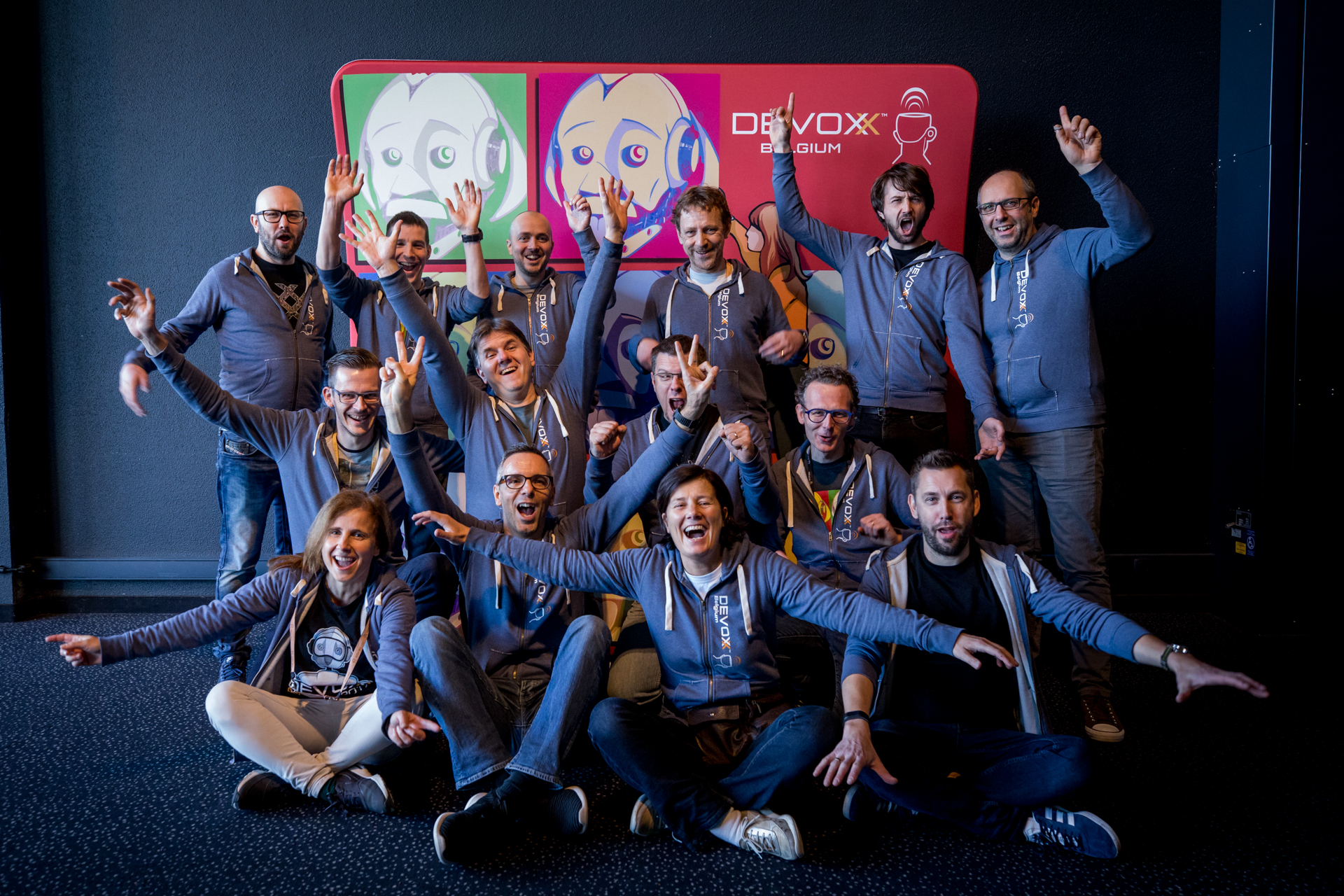
Devoxx Belgium 2019 team

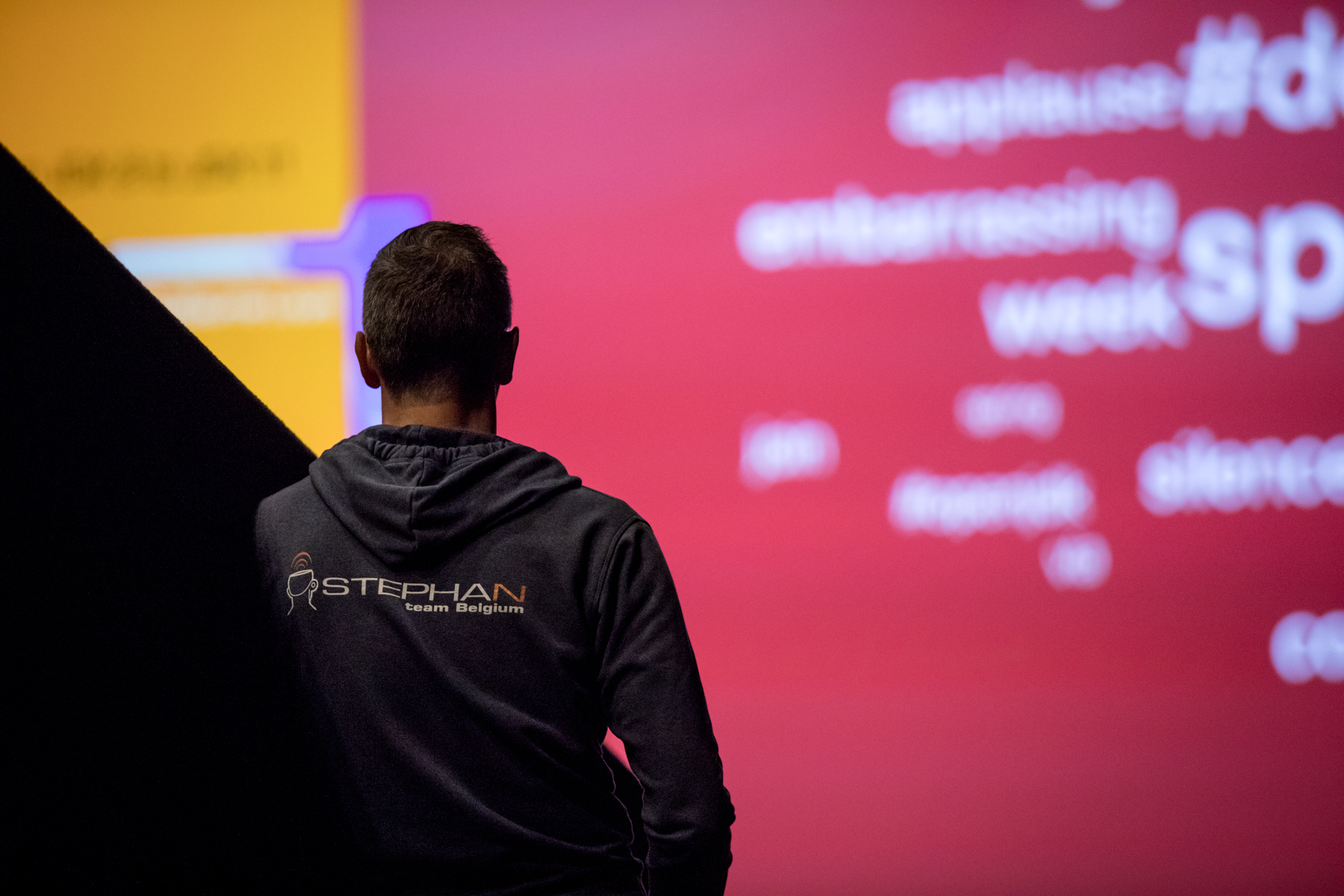
Stephan Janssen

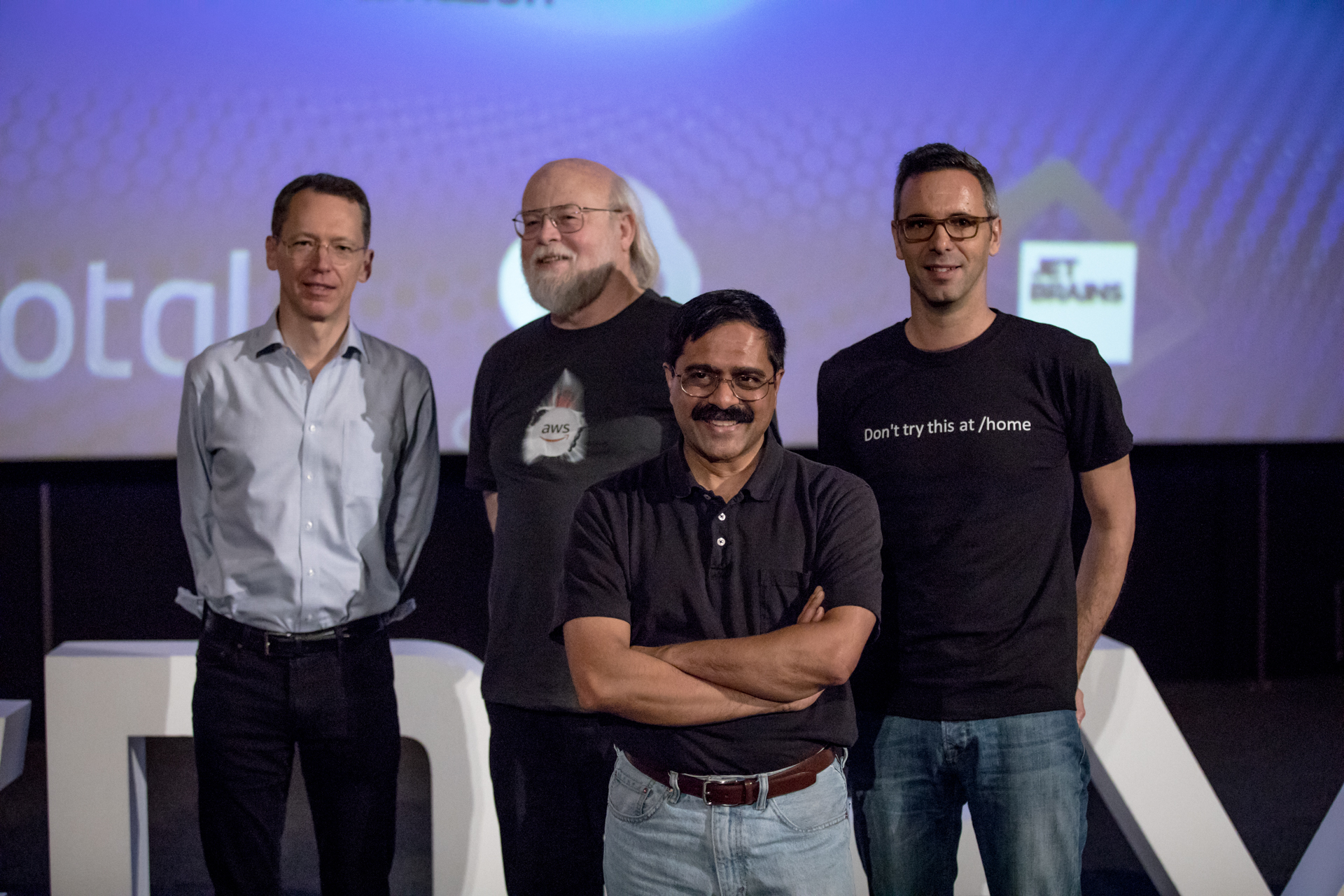
Opening keynote Devoxx Belgium 2018 with James Gosling, Mark Reinhold, Venkat Subramaniam and Stephan Janssen.

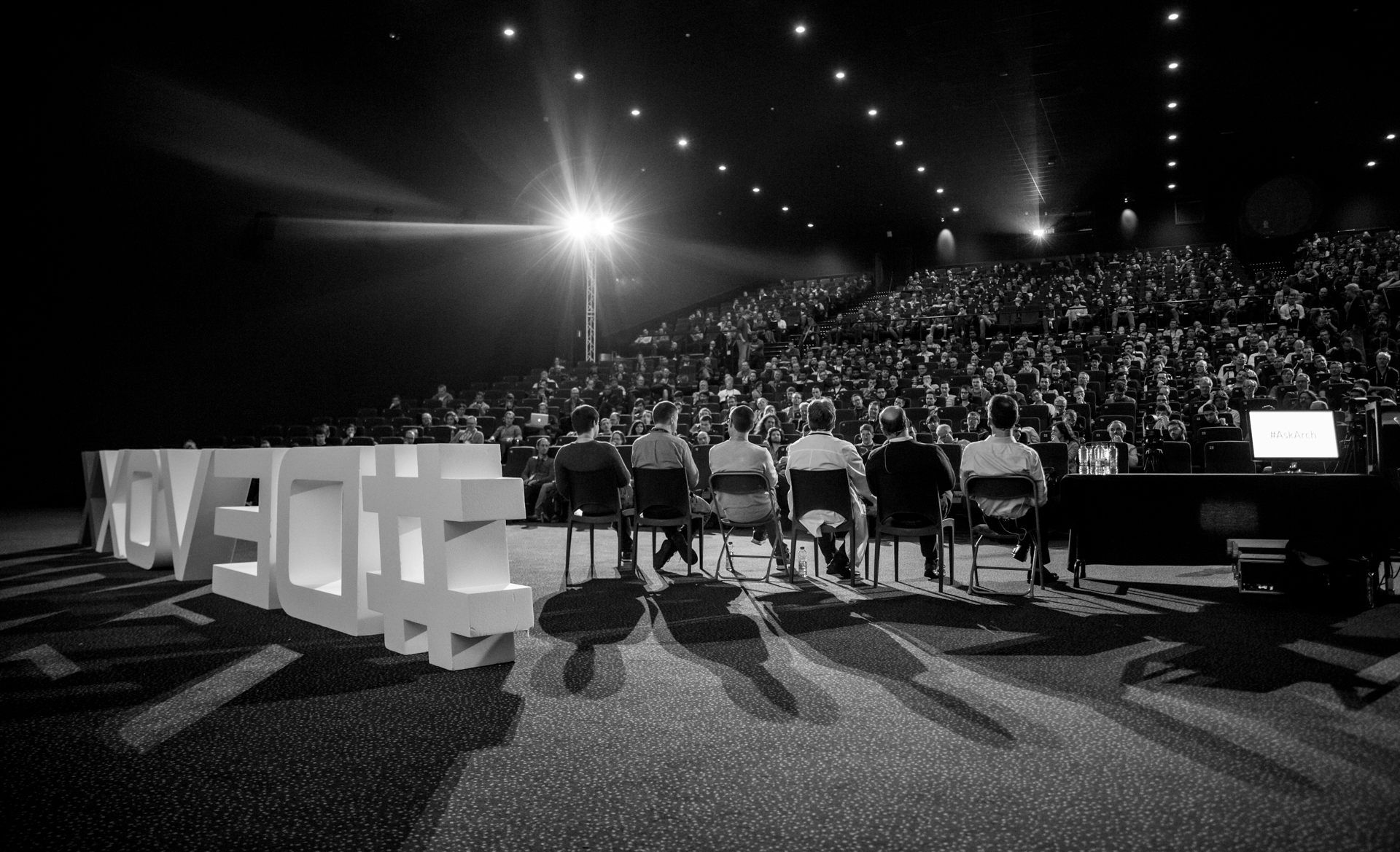
Picture taken during the Devoxx Belgium 2018 Ask the architect conference session.

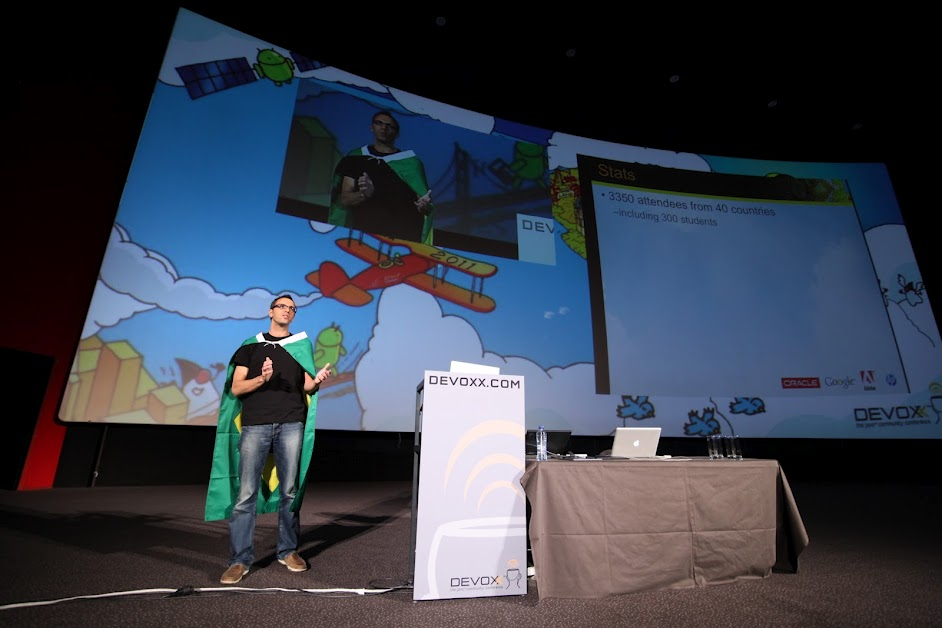
Devoxx 2011 Keynote

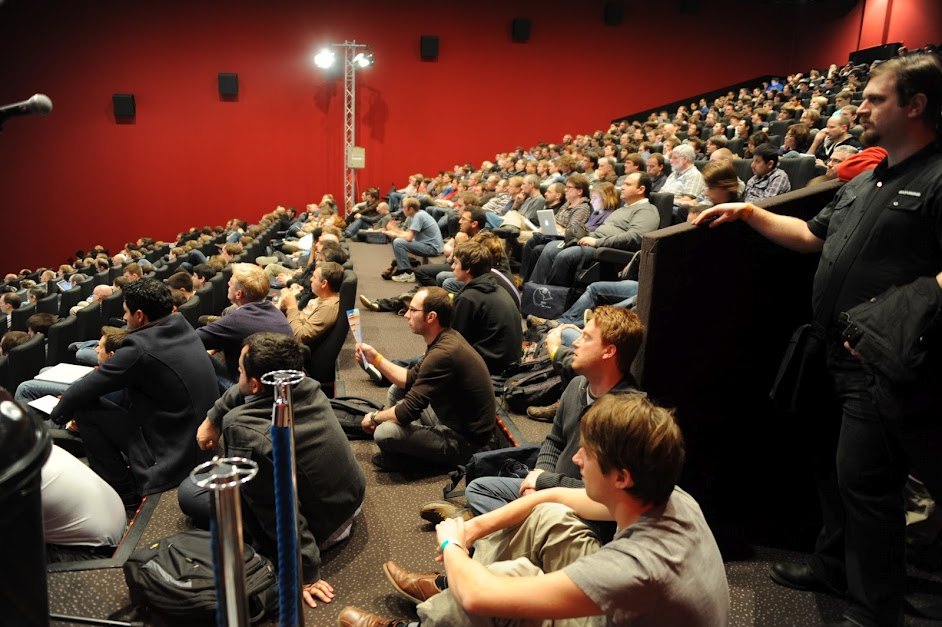
Devoxx 2011 Room 8

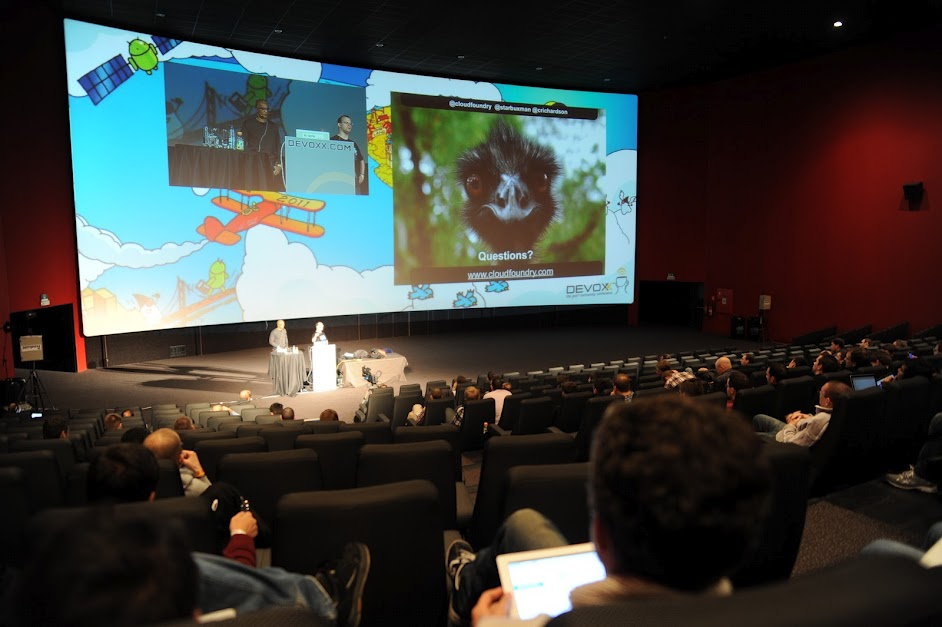
Devoxx 2011 cinema screens

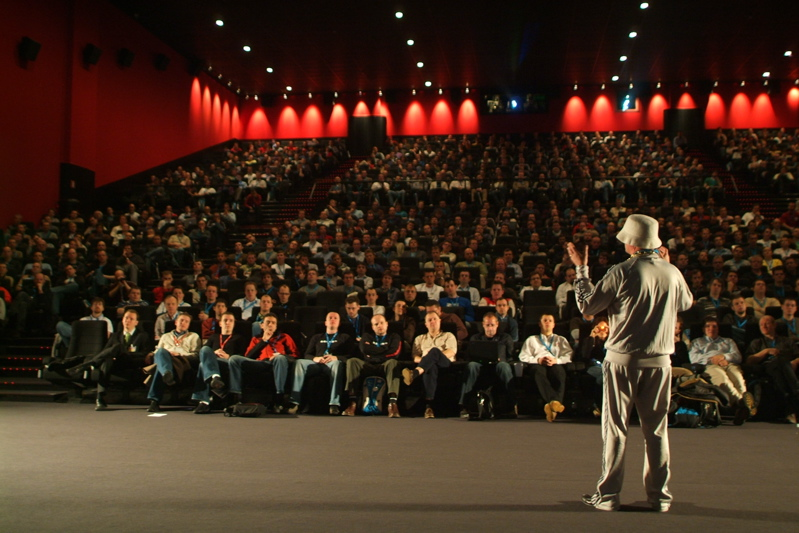
JavaPolis 2006

Devoxx (formerly named JavaPolis) is a developers community conference series created in 2001 by Stephan Janssen, organized by the Belgian Java User Group (BeJUG). The conference takes place every year in Belgium around October or November. With over 2,800 attendees in 2006, JavaPolis became the biggest vendor-independent Java conference in the world. In 2008, the conference was renamed Devoxx.

With over 3,300 attendees, Devoxx 2011 was sold out 6 weeks before the event. In 2012, the conference was once again sold out 4 October 6 weeks before the event, reaching 3400 attendees from 40 countries. In 2017, Devoxx Belgium combi and conference tickets were already sold out the end of August. In 2019, the Devoxx Belgium conference-only tickets were sold out after 10 days, in 2023 in a few seconds.

In 2012, the first edition of Devoxx France, organized by the Paris Java User Group took place from 18/4 until 20/4 in Paris. With more than 1200 attendees and 149 speakers Devoxx France was sold out 1 week before the event.

The first edition of Devoxx 4 Kids 2012 was organized in Ghent (13 Oct) and Brussels (20 Oct) attracting 65 teenagers between 10 and 14 years. The teenagers played with Scratch, programmed Lego Mindstorms and discovered the wonderful world of Mars Rovers and the NAO robot.

Devoxx UK 2013 was announced during the opening keynote of Devoxx 2012 (14 November, Antwerp). The first edition of Devoxx UK was a two-day conference hosted at the Business Design Centre in London on 26–27 March. The event ran back to back with Devoxx France and attracted over 500 attendees in its first year. Devoxx UK was spearheaded in 2013 by Ben Evans, Martijn Verburg, Dan Hardiker, James McGivern and Stephan Janssen in close collaboration with the London Java Community. Since January 2014, when Mark Hazell was appointed the new Chairman for Devoxx UK, he has focused Devoxx UK efforts, alongside Dan Hardiker, Stephan Janssen, James McGivern, a program committee of developer volunteers and community groups including the London Java Community.

In 2014, during the opening keynote at Devoxx BE, Devoxx PL was announced. Unlike all other editions, this Polish conference is not built from the ground up. It will replace a conference formerly known as 33rd Degree. The first edition of this event is planned to take place in Kraków Congres Centre on 22–24 June 2015.

In 2015, during the opening keynote at Devoxx France, Devoxx Morocco was announced. Again an existing conference that joins the Devoxx family. It replaces the conference formerly known as JMagreb, which takes place in Casablanca (Morocco) in "Le Studio Des Arts Vivants".

Devoxx US was announced during the opening keynote of Devoxx UK 2016 on 8 June. This inaugural event is scheduled for 21–23 March 2017 at the San Jose Convention Center. The Eclipse Foundation will be responsible for overall operation and production of Devoxx US. The event is expected to attract more than 1000 software developers and over 30 sponsors.

Devoxx Ukraine was announced during the opening keynote of Devoxx France 2018 in April. JavaDay Ukraine was rebranded to Devoxx Ukraine to reach more international attendees, speakers and sponsors.

Planned on 15 April 2020, Devoxx France 2020 was postponed to 1–3 July 2020 due to the ongoing COVID-19 pandemic, until it was definitely cancelled via an announcement held on the initial date.

On 7 December 2020 it was announced that Devoxx France 2021 would be held on 30 June - 2 July 2021 due to health restrictions again linked to the Covid-19 crisis. This would have been the 10th edition, but as the 2020 edition did not take place, the organizers decided to label it "9 3/4" as a reference to the fictitious platform in Harry Potter's universe. On 3 May 2021, the 3-day conference was postponed to 29 September - 1 October 2021.

Just a few days after the end of the 2021 edition, Devoxx France announced the next edition: the (final) 10th edition would be held on 20–22 April 2022.

Devoxx Belgium was canceled in 2020 and 2021 due to the COVID-19 pandemic. The 19th edition of Devoxx Belgium took place during the week of 10 October 2022.

== Locations ==
Devoxx (BE) takes place in one of the biggest European cinema complexes, the Kinepolis, located in Antwerp, Belgium. Only part of the cinema complex is used for the conference. As a result, the speakers' video and slides are projected on the huge cinema screens using the available THX audio setup. Devoxx France 2014 was held at the Marriott Paris Rive Gauche conference center, while Devoxx France 2015 will be held at the Palais des congrès de Paris.

The 4 editions of Devoxx UK have been held in the Business Design Centre, London, a former Victorian agricultural hall situated in Islington.

The first 3 editions of Devoxx France took place in the Marriott Rive Gauche hotel and since 2015 Devoxx France has moved to "Le Palais des Congrès de Paris".

Devoxx Poland 2015 took place at ICE Kraków Congress Centre.

Devoxx Morocco 2015 took place in "Le Studio Des Arts Vivants".

Devoxx US 2017 took place once in the San Jose convention center.

Devoxx UA has taken place in Kyiv every year under this name since 2018.

== Voxxed ==
Voxxed is a website for software developers launched by Stephan Janssen and Mark Hazell on 12 November 2014. The site is a collection of entries submitted by its registered users, consisting of both original and syndicated content. It carries the strapline "Share the Knowledge," reflecting this policy of sharing material from elsewhere on the web. The name "Voxxed" is a play-on-words with the word "Devoxx" and whilst a separate corporate entity, has strong ties to the event series. Voxxed editors are on site at Devoxx events to interview speakers and attendees, and the content is then shared on Voxxed.com.

The website is divided into six categories, consisting of; Java, JVM, Mobile, Cloud, Methodology, and Future. Each category is visible on the front page to new users and those who browse the site without logging into an account.

== Voxxed Days Initiative ==
Voxxed Days is an international series of one day events for the Voxxed Community, focusing on the same areas as the Voxxed website (including: Server Side Java, Java SE, Cloud and Big Data, Web & HTML, Mobile, JVM, Architecture & Security, Methodology, and Future Technologies). Events are also attended by members of the Voxxed team, who then feature interviews and content from the event on the main Voxxed website.
