= Bizagi =

Software company

- Developer: Bizagi
- Written in: Java and .NET Framework
- Available in: English, Spanish, French, German, Russian, Dutch, Italian, Chinese, Japanese, Portuguese
- Type: Business process management
- License: Freemium
- Website: bizagi.com

Bizagi is a privately owned software company established in 1989 with headquarters in the US, and offices in UK, Spain, Germany & Latin America. Its name is a portmanteau of "business" and "agility".

The company provides enterprise software for Business Process Automation on a low-code development platform. The company originates from the industry of Business Process Management (BPM).

== Products ==
Three products combine to make up the Bizagi platform:

- Bizagi Modeler is a freeware application to graphically diagram, document and simulate processes in a standard format known as Business Process Model and Notation (BPMN). Using Bizagi Modeler, processes can be published to Word, PDF, Wiki, Web or SharePoint, or exported to Visio, image formats (png, bpm, svg or jpg) and XPDL, to be shared and communicated across the organization.
- Bizagi Studio is a Freeware Business Process Management (BPM) solution that allows organizations to build (automate) business processes and workflows. It acts as the construction module where users build process applications (user interface, forms, business rules, etc.) associated to their business processes and workflows, in preparation for process execution. Models are stored in a database and then used at runtime for process execution.
- Bizagi Automation takes the previously modeled & automated processes and executes them across the organization. Processes automated by Bizagi Automation can be viewed via a Work Portal that end users can access through any device.

== Applications ==
Bizagi can be used to automate processes and has made available a set of executable process templates that can be downloaded from Bizagi.

In 2013, Bizagi introduced widgets to add functionality to processes. These series of maps, pie charts, calculators etc. are created and maintained by the public Bizagi Community via its Widget Xchange.

== See also ==
- Business Process Modeling
- Business Process Model and Notation
- Business Process Automation
- Business Process Modeling
- Business process management
- Business process automation
- Workflow
