= Enterprise architecture management =

Enterprise architecture management (EAM) is a "management practice that establishes, maintains and uses a coherent set of guidelines, architecture principles and governance regimes that provide direction and practical help in the design and development of an enterprise's architecture to achieve its vision and strategy."

== Overview ==
The fundamental prerequisites for effective EAM are a current, consistent baseline of information about the as-is landscape and an integrated planning process from demand to budget to reach the to-be landscape. The enterprise architecture function also involves reviewing and consolidating detailed architecture decisions and migration plans to identify efficiencies, advance standardization, and align business and IT priorities.

As IT architectural layers, business support processes, and organizational structures become more sophisticated and prone to constant change, EAM will only result in haphazard business and IT alignment if the primary focus is on delivering sets of technically based models. This approach is only helpful insofar as it depicts the enterprise architecture as a snapshot in time, but it offers no reiterative process support to develop architecture solutions and test against different scenarios, benchmarks, and standards as dictated by the ever converging business and IT strategy.

Moreover, a model-centric approach is prohibitively time-intensive to keep updated and leaves too much room for error as changes to the architecture occur unchecked and isolated in the heads of small groups of architecture specialists. Instead, the EAM effort has to bring the highly distributed knowledge of all experts to the table and allow every participant to provide such knowledge and input in the terms that best fit the experience and expectations of the contributing stakeholders.

== Application ==
Successful enterprise architecture programs are approached from a management perspective as opposed to a modeling perspective. A new generation of EA Planning tools are emerging that support not only the modeling of the architecture, but also the creation of roll-out and implementation plans for continuous IT improvement over time.

An important aspect of this approach is support of collaboration amongst a wide group of stakeholders from both business and IT including C-level, IT strategists, planning teams, technology implementers, and business analysts, who contribute to the EA management and planning process. In this way EAM supports sustainable business strategy realization.

== See also ==
- Application architecture
- Service-oriented architecture
- Information technology governance
- Project portfolio management
- Risk management
