= IBM Blueworks Live =

IBM business software

- Developer: IBM
- Available in: English
- Type: Business process modeling
- License: Freemium
- Website: www.blueworkslive.com

IBM Blueworks Live is a business process modeller, belonging under the set of IBM SmartCloud applications. The application is designed to help organizations discover and document their business processes, business decisions and policies in a collaborative manner. It is designed to be simple and intuitive to use, while still having the capabilities to implement more complex models. Blueworks Live adheres to the BPMN 2.0 standard developed and maintained by BPMN.org.

== Purpose ==
Blueworks Live is intended to be a business-user focused process & decision discovery and documentation tool. There are a number of more complicated BPMN 2.0 specification attributes that are left out in the aim of creating simple, understandable processes & decisions in Blueworks Live. All data is stored in the cloud eliminating the need for infrastructure beyond a computer with a web browser.

Blueworks Live is also fully integrated with IBM's BPM product enabling customers to quickly take their processes from discovery to implementation if so desired.

== History ==
The original concept for business process modeler with a SaaS deployment model came with BluePrint, an application developed by Lombardi Inc. The company with its range of BPM products caught IBM's attention, so in January 2010 they made an acquisition of Lombardi. IBM already had a product in the same space known as IBM Blueworks, but that was superseded by the new technology of Lombardi's Blueprint and became Blueworks Live. IBM launched the Blueworks Live on 20 November 2010.

== Features ==
=== Discovery and documentation ===
==== Capturing processes & decisions ====
Blueworks Live provides various tools for companies to capture business processes & decisions, using a collaborative approach to discovering those processes with maximum accuracy.

There are three different views for process data, the Discovery Map, Process Diagram, and Documentation. The Discovery Map is intended to enable business users to quickly and efficiently get the process activities and milestones out on 'paper'. This view is all about getting the information out there as quickly as possible without worrying about the process logic. When you have sufficiently identified the process in the Discovery Map, use the details popup to provide the Participant data, and then Blueworks Live can generate the Process Diagram where you will add the details of the process logic and flows. Each Participant identified in the Discovery Map will have a swimlane and the activities assigned will be in their swimlane. The Documentation view is intended to read like a Microsoft Word document with all of the process documentation that you have added in the details popup.

Decisions only have one view, the Decision Diagram. This is a graphical representation of the decision, the flows, and sub-decisions involved. Each decision and sub-decision has inputs and outputs that can be defined to populate the decision table. Blueworks Live is compliant with the DMN 1.0 specification.

==== Data import and export ====
Blueworks Live allows users to import diagrams from:

- Microsoft Visio using the vdx XML format
- BPMN 2.0 XML
- XPDL 2.1 XML

In terms of export, users can automatically generate outputs in following formats:

- Microsoft PowerPoint
- Microsoft Word
- Microsoft Excel Process Data (Export Process option)
- BPMN 2.0 (Export Process option) (Note: This output format does not contain the diagrams or diagram elements)
- XPDL 2.1 (Export Process option)
- IBM WebSphere Business Modeler XML 7.0 (Export Process option)

=== Centralized collaboration ===
Blueworks Live uses many social networking features, enabling team collaboration:

- Instant messaging
- Live news feeds
- Commenting (process changes)
- Newsfeed - current work statistics and reports on the site's main page

==== Public and private communities ====
Blueworks Live use its main page to inform users about all the changes occurring to company processes, where the user is involved (private), or about information regarding useful and news about wider BPM communities. This involves blogs, tutorials or application changes and updates.

==== Licensing ====
Blueworks Live distinguishes between four types of license: Editors, Contributors, Viewers, and Community.

Editors are able to:

- Create and modify processes & decisions
- Publish processes & decisions
- Automate processes
- Manage spaces
- Utilize the Analyze and Playback features

Contributors are able to:

- Add Comments to processes & decisions
- Participate in process automation

Viewers are able to:

- View published processes and decisions
- Viewers can follow the link to open published process in Blueworks Live.
- Viewers can review process & decision details: Discovery map, Process diagram & Process documentation

The viewer capabilities are to enable a wider adoption across an enterprise. In cases where a customer utilizes SSO for login, and has viewer licenses, the account administrator can enable JIT provisioning.

Community users can:

- View the Community tab
- Perform the role of account Admin

=== Automating simple processes ===
Blueworks Live provides its users also with automate process feature. There are two different types of process allowed in Blueworks Live, workflow and checklist.

The workflow process application will allow you to create either parallel or sequential activities. This is useful for review and approval types of processes. This process type will distribute the tasks in a very precise manner determined by the design of the workflow you create.

The checklist process application is useful when you want to disseminate information all at once, without caring in what order people respond.

=== Privacy and security ===
==== Data privacy and security ====
All the information and data stored in Blueworks live is private, and inaccessible by IBM unless specifically given written permission for access by a customer.

==== Network security ====
Servers are protected by firewall configured to block all traffic on ports other than 80 or 443 (HTTP, HTTPS). Blueworks live also uses 256-bit Secure Sockets Layer (SSL 3.0 / TLS 1.2) for server authentication and data encryption. User authentication is ensured by providing every user a unique password tied with his personal or company e-mail address.

==== Authentication ====
IBM lets the users choose their own preferred level of authentication in application settings. There are two security levels: Medium and High.

- Medium: The password is required when changing it to new one, user is locked out, if they fail to log in several times in a row.
- High: Password policy, maximizing password strength, requires user to change it every 90 days.

== Compatibility ==
Since Blueworks Live is a web application, it can be accessed from any workstation with Internet connectivity and a web browser, regardless of the operating system. Some of the basic features are also accessible through a mobile phone. Browsers currently supported include Internet Explorer, Firefox, Safari and Google Chrome.

== Sources ==
- List of Blueworks Live features, Official Blueworks Live site - https://www.ibm.com/products/blueworkslive
- IBM launches Blueworks Live, business process fixes as a service, Larry Dignan, October 11, 2010, ZDNET.com - http://www.zdnet.com/blog/btl/ibm-launches-blueworks-live-business-process-fixes-as-a-service/40286
- Blueworks Live article, BPM geek Initiative website - http://bpmgeek.com/blueworks-live
- Automate manual processes with IBM Blueworks Live, Belinda Chang, Staff Software Engineer, IBM developer works - http://www.ibm.com/developerworks/websphere/bpmjournal/1106_chang/1106_chang.html?ca=drs-
- IBM Blueworks Live sneak-peak [sic], Column 2 BPM blog - http://www.column2.com/2010/11/ibm-blueworks-live-sneak-peak/
- Blueworks Live Update, April 4, 2011 by Scott Francis, BP3 BPM blog - http://www.bp-3.com/blogs/2011/04/blueworks-live-update-april-2011/ Archived 2012-02-06 at the Wayback Machine
- IBM Announces Blueworks Live, 'Lite' SaaS Based BPM, by David Roe, CMS Wire - http://www.cmswire.com/cms/enterprise-cms/ibm-announces-blueworks-live-lite-saas-based-bpm-008844.php
- Blueworks Live: A Curate’s Egg, Mike Gammage, November 11, 2010, posted in "Cloud", Business Computing World - http://www.businesscomputingworld.co.uk/blueworks-live-a-curates-egg/
