= CMMN =

Graphical representation

Case Management Model and Notation (CMMN) is a graphical representation for expressing a Case, as well as an interchange format for exchanging Case models among different tools. The CMMN was introduced in 2014 and is maintained by the Object Management Group (OMG).

== History ==
A consortium of 11 companies contributed to the development of CMMN. A Beta version was released in 2013, and Version 1.0 of CMMN was released in May 2014. This was amended by Version 1.1 in December 2016. The CMMN is now maintained by the Object Management Group.

While Business Process Model and Notation (BPMN) deals with predictable processes, CMMN is more oriented to focus on supporting processes that are intrinsically unpredictable, not repeatable, weakly-structured, and knowledge-intensive.

CMMN can often require ad-hoc actions.

== See also ==
- Advanced case management
- BPMN
- Business Process Management
- Business Process Modeling
- Comparison of Business Process Modeling Notation tools
- Decision Model and Notation
