= Deployment flowchart =

Business process mapping

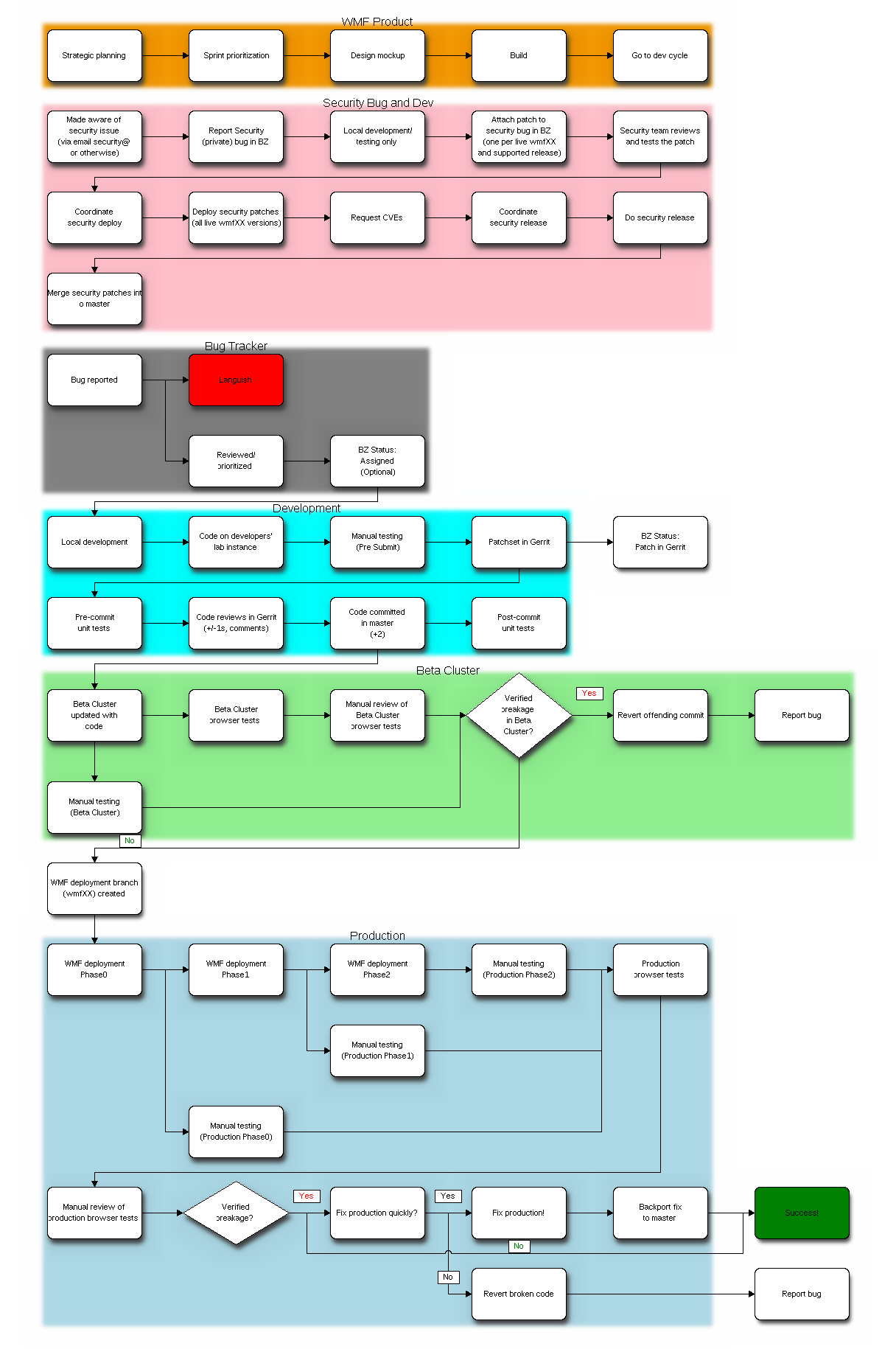
Wikimedia development and deployment flowchart, mainly refers to software deployment and IT infrastructure deployment

A deployment flowchart (sometimes referred to as a cross functional flowchart) is a business process mapping tool used to articulate the steps and stakeholders of a given process.

== Structure ==
Deployment flowcharts consist of a sequence of activity steps, as well as the interactions between individuals or groups. Each participant in the process is displayed on the map (which is constructed as a matrix) - tasks/activities are then articulated in sequence under the column corresponding to that stakeholder.

== Uses ==
Deployment flowcharts highlight the relationships between stakeholders in addition to the process flow. Often utilized within Six sigma activity, completed flowcharts are commonly used to examine the interfaces between “participants” which are typically causes for delays and other associated issues. Deployment flowcharts are useful for determining who within an organization is required to implement a process and are sometimes used as a business planning tool.

== Flowchart creation ==
While deployment flowcharts can be drawn by hand using pen and paper, various software tools include functionality to construct the flowcharts on computer. These include products such as Microsoft Visio.

== See also ==
- Business process
