= ActiveVOS =

Business process management suite

- Developer(s): Active Endpoints
- Stable release: 8.0 / September 2010
- Operating system: Cross-platform
- Type: BPMS
- License: Proprietary
- Website: http://activevos.com

ActiveVOS is a business process management suite. Business processes are designed using the graphical BPMN 2.0 notation. The process engine implements the WS-BPEL 2.0 standard as well as BPEL4People for processes that require people to perform tasks from a task list.
