= Alfresco Software =

Information management software

Alfresco Software Inc.

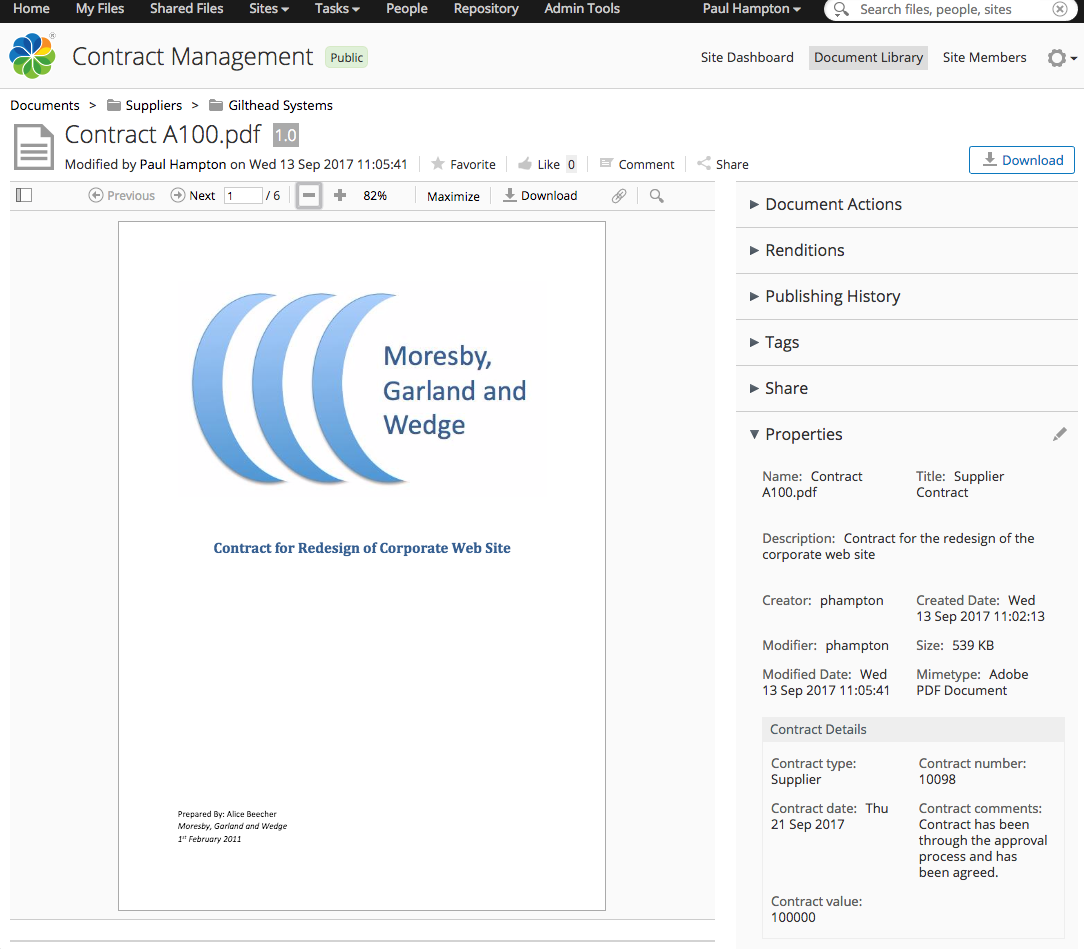
- Screenshot of a contract document in Alfresco's user interface, Share, showing the built-in viewer and metadata display
- Developers: Alfresco Software, Inc.
- Release: November 2005; 21 years ago
- Stable release: 26.2 / 2026-07-30[±]
- Written in: Java, JSP, and JavaScript
- Operating system: Cross-platform
- Type: ECM, BPM, and Records Management
- License: Enterprise Edition is proprietary; Community Edition is LGPL v3
- Website: www.alfresco.com

Alfresco Software is a collection of information management software products for Microsoft Windows and Unix-like operating systems developed by Alfresco Software Inc. using Java technology. The software, branded as a Digital Business Platform is principally a proprietary & a commercially licensed open source platform, supports open standards, and provides enterprise scale. There are also open source Community Editions available licensed under LGPLv3.

== History ==
John Newton (co-founder of Documentum) and John Powell (a former COO of Business Objects) founded Alfresco Software, Inc. in 2005.

In July 2005, Alfresco released the first version of their software.

Alfresco initially focused on document management, in May 2006, the company announced its intention to expand into web content management by acquiring senior technical and managerial staff from Interwoven; this included its VP of Web Content Management, two principal engineers, and a member of its user-interface team.

In October 2009, the 2009 Open Source CMS Market Share Report described Alfresco as a “leading Java-based open source web content management system”.

In 2010, Alfresco sponsored a new open-source BPM engine called Activiti.

In July 2011, Alfresco and Ephesoft announced a technology collaboration to offer document capture and Content Management Interoperability Services brought together for intelligent PDF capture and search and workflow development.

In January 2013, Alfresco appointed Doug Dennerline, former president of SuccessFactors, former EVP of Sales at Salesforce.com, and former CEO of WebEx, as its new CEO.

In September 2014, Alfresco 5 was released with new reporting and analytics features and an overhaul of its document search tool, moving from Lucene to Solr.

In November 2016, Alfresco launched an AWS Quickstart for building an Alfresco Content Services server cluster on the AWS Cloud.

In March 2017, Alfresco rebranded as the Digital Business Platform. This included the release of the Application Development Framework with reusable Angular JS(2.0) components.

On February 8, 2018, it was announced that Alfresco was acquired by the private equity firm Thomas H. Lee Partners, L.P.

On September 9, 2020, Alfresco was acquired again by Hyland Software from Thomas H. Lee Partners for an undisclosed amount.

== Products and services ==
Alfresco's core platform offering consists of three primary products. It is designed for clients who require modularity and scalable performance. It can be deployed on-premises on servers or in the cloud using an Amazon Web Services (AWS) Quick Start. A multi-tenant SaaS offering is also available.

Alfresco provides enterprise content management (ECM) services. This includes a content and metadata repository, a web interface named Share, the ability to define automated business rules, and text indexing. In addition, services that provide records management functionality to address information governance requirements are also provided by the company. Alfresco Governance Services is DoD 5015.02 certified for records management.

== See also ==
- List of content management systems
- List of collaborative software
- Cloud collaboration
- Document collaboration
- Document-centric collaboration
