= Activiti (software) =

Open-source workflow engine

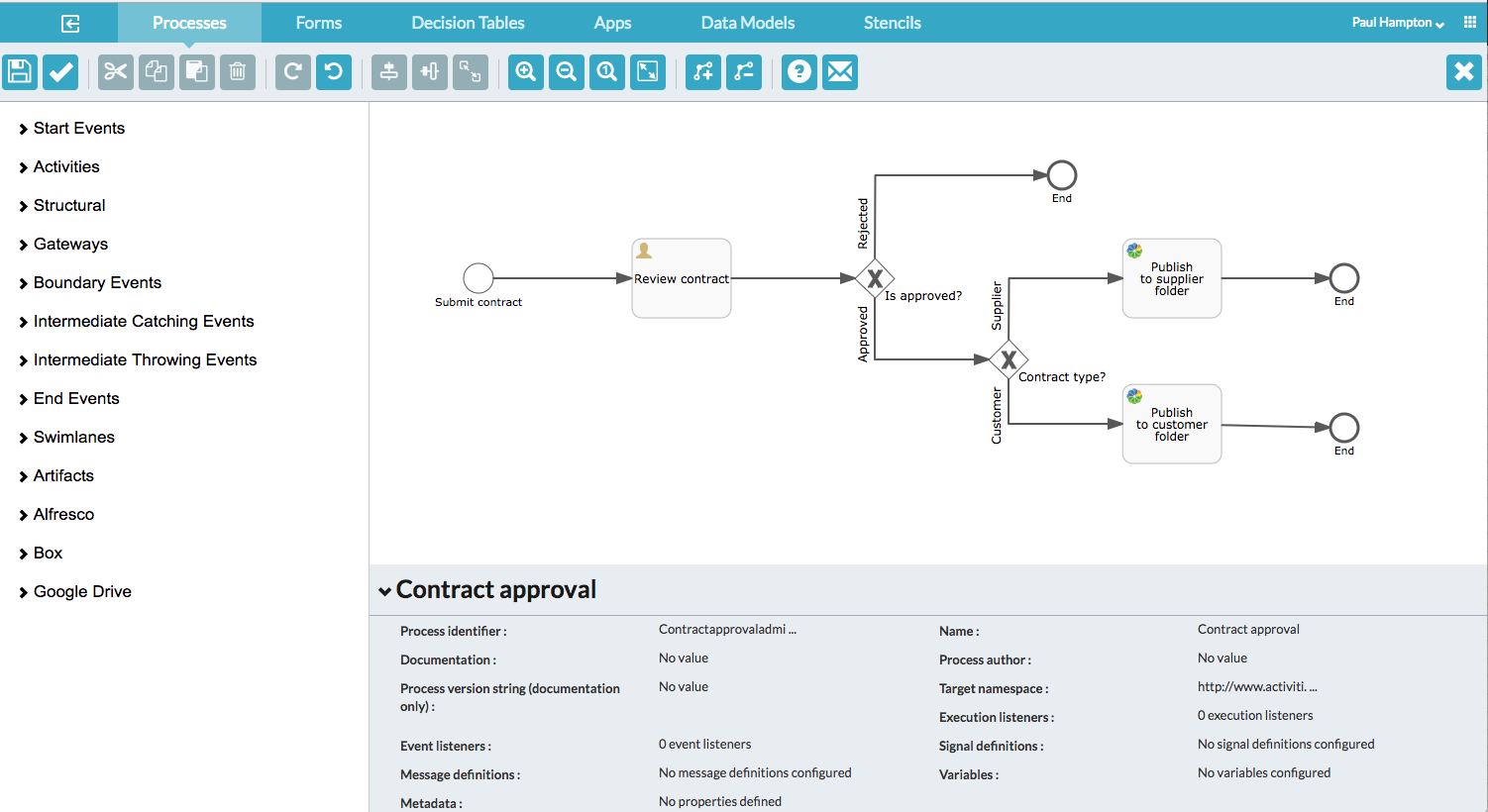
- Screenshot of a contract workflow in Alfresco's Activiti Process Modeler
- Developers: Alfresco and the Activiti community
- Initial release: December 2010; 15 years ago
- Stable release: 8.2.0 / 22 Jan 2024
- Written in: Java
- Operating system: Cross-platform
- Type: workflow engine, BPM
- License: Apache License 2.0
- Website: www.activiti.org
- Repository: github.com/Activiti/Activiti

Activiti is an open-source workflow engine written in Java that can execute business processes described in BPMN 2.0. Activiti is the foundation for Alfresco's Alfresco Process Services (APS) and Alfresco is the Activiti project's leading sponsor.

== History ==
In March 2010, Tom Baeyens and Joram Barrez, two key developers for jBPM left Red Hat and started Activiti as employees of Alfresco. Activiti is based on their workflow experience with jBPM, but is a new code base, not based on any previous jBPM code.

The first version of Activiti was 5.0, to indicate that product is the continuation of experience they gained via jBPM 1 through 4.

In October 2016, Barrez, Rademakers (author of Activiti in Action) and other contributors left Alfresco. The departing developers forked the Activiti code to start a new project called Flowable.

In February 2017, a new commercial version of Activiti was released and rebranded as Alfresco Process Services.

In May 2017, Activiti released version 6.0.0 with new support for ad hoc sub processes and a new application user interface.

== Components ==
The project is a suite of applications that work together:

- Modeler, a web-based graphical workflow authoring interface
- Designer, an Eclipse plug-in for developing workflows
- Engine, the core workflow processor
- Explorer, a web tool to deploy process definitions, start new process instances and carry-out work on workflows
- Cycle, a web app for collaboration between business users and software engineers

== Alternative modeling GUI ==
The Yaoqiang BPMN Editor (FLOSS, GPLv3) can connect to the Activiti engine and thus can be used as a graphical workflow authoring interface, as an alternative to Activiti Modeler.

The DocuBrain Workflow Editor is a standalone BPMN 2.0 compliant workflow editor that can be used to create and edit generic BPMN processes. The editor supports direct connections to Activiti as well as all of Activiti's customization (such as Activiti specific element attributes, Activiti specific tasks like Camel Task, Mule Task, etc.).
