= Jaime Teixidor =

Spanish musician, conductor and composer (1884–1957)

Jaume Teixidor Dalmau (Spanish: [ˈxajme tesiˈðoɾ ðalˈmaw]; Catalan: Jaume Teixidor Dalmau [ˈʒawmə təʃiˈðoɾ ðəlˈmaw]) was born in Barcelona on April 16, 1884, and died in Barakaldo on February 23, 1957. He was a Spanish musician, conductor, publisher, and composer.

After studying composition and conducting in Barcelona he joined the army in 1906 as a musician, performing on the saxophone. He became the director of the 68th “Africa” Regiment band (Banda Música del regimiento 68) in the autonomous Spanish city of Melilla on the Moroccan coast. He retired from military service in 1920 after thirteen years with this band.

In 1924, he directed the Banda de Música Primitiva in Carlet and also taught piano and violin. He resided in Carlet for only a couple of years and then moved to Manises, Valencia, to lead the Banda del Círculo Instructivo Musical. In 1928 he won a competition to direct the municipal band of Barakaldo, which he did until the end of his life. One source indicates he gave up the direction of the band for political reasons during the Spanish Civil War. In Barakaldo he also set up a music publishing firm, which published his compositions and others.

His daughter, María Teresa Tico Texidor (1907–1993), was also a composer, including Paz Eterna and Rosa Evangélica.

== Compositions ==
Teixidor composed over 500 works. These include marches and pasodobles as well as boleros, foxtrots, jotas, sambas, tangos, schottisches, and waltzes for band.

His best-known composition is Amparito Roca, written in 1925 and first performed in September 1925 at the Teatro del Siglo in Carlet. The score was published in Madrid in 1925 by Música Moderna, and in Barcelona by Joaquim Mora in 1928. Boosey & Hawkes published this in 1935 in an arrangement by Aubrey Winter (1870–1955).

Other compositions include:

- El Arbuyo (jota basque dedicated to Sociedad Deportiva Arbuyo, a local football club)
- Auxilium Christianorum (processional march)
- Bar Cocodrilo
- Boas Festas
- Brisa de la Pampa (Pampa Breeze)
- Caridad (Charity, fox trot)
- Carmen Rieria (pasodoble)
- Carrascosa (pasodoble)
- Chumbalajero
- De Andalucía a Aragón (pasodoble)
- Diosa Venus (mazurka)
- Domus Aurea (processional march)
- Elocuencias Tango
- El Jaranes Vals Jota
- En Vanguardia (pasodoble)
- Fiesta en la Caleta (pasodoble)
- Gloria al Trabajo (Glory to Labor, pasodoble)
- Una Jornada Militar (descriptive piece)
- Lazos de Amistad (pasodoble)
- Luz Divina (Divine Light, funeral march)
- Mano Generosa (bolero)
- María (schottische)
- María Auxiliadora (processional march)
- El Moncayesa Jota
- Moriles Carbonell (pasodoble)
- El Nino de la Estrella (pasodoble)
- Nuevo Mundo (schottische)
- Piedad Señor y Sueño Eterno (funeral marches)
- La Pilarica (processional march)
- Placentero (pasadoble)
- Sabor de Espana (potpourri)
- Sacris (la marcha al Santísimo sobre motivos del Tantum ergo, co-authored with María Teresa Tico Texidor)
- Sangre de Artista (pasodoble)
- Silvetas Cubanas Rhumba
- Sombras en la Senda Vals
- Sueño Eterno (funeral march)
- Valencia, Tierra de Flores (pasodoble)
- La Virgen de la Roca (co-authored with María Teresa Tico Texidor)
- La Virgen Milagrosa (The Miraculous Virgin; processional march)
- Yolita (rumba)
- Zinia-Diana (pasodoble)
