= Interoperability =

Ability of systems to work with each other

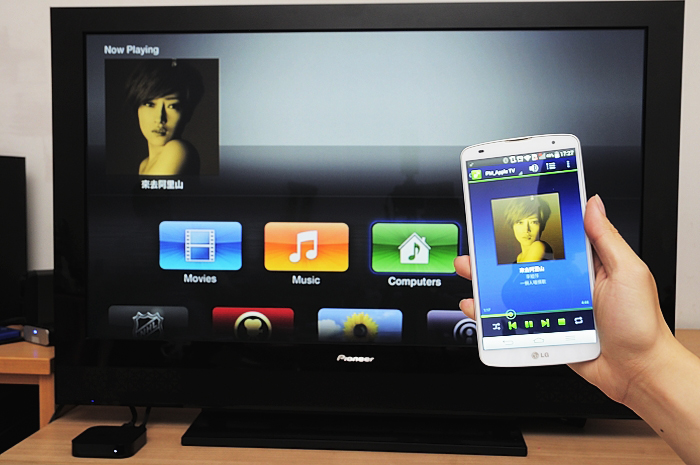
An example of software interoperability: a mobile device and a TV device both playing the same digital music file that is stored on a server off-screen in the home network

Interoperability is a characteristic of a product or system to work with other products or systems. While the term was initially defined for information technology or systems engineering services to allow for information exchange, a broader definition takes into account social, political, and organizational factors that impact system-to-system performance.

Types of interoperability include syntactic interoperability, where two systems can communicate with each other, and cross-domain interoperability, where multiple organizations work together and exchange information.

== Types ==
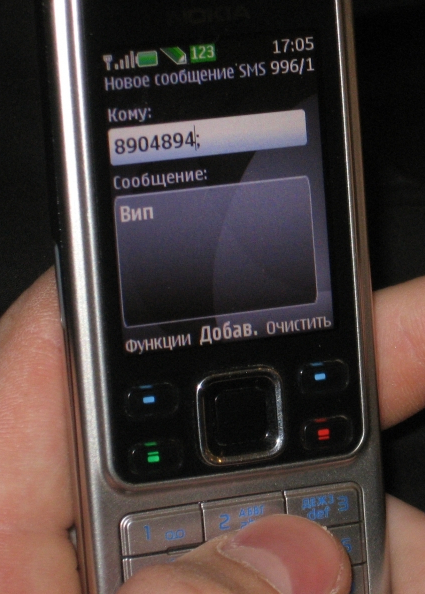
Text messaging on a mobile phone using SMS, which is fully interoperable between different mobile carrier operators

If two or more systems use common data formats and communication protocols, then they are capable of communicating with each other, and they exhibit syntactic interoperability. XML and SQL are examples of common data formats and protocols. Low-level data formats also contribute to syntactic interoperability, ensuring that alphabetical characters are stored in the same ASCII or a Unicode format in all the communicating systems.

Beyond the ability of two or more computer systems to exchange information, semantic interoperability is the ability to automatically interpret the information exchanged meaningfully and accurately in order to produce useful results as defined by the end users of both systems. To achieve semantic interoperability, both sides must refer to a common information exchange reference model. The content of the information exchange requests are unambiguously defined: what is sent is the same as what is understood.

Cross-domain interoperability involves multiple social, organizational, political, legal entities working together for a common interest or information exchange.

== Essential properties of an interoperability standard ==
An interoperability standard must observe these properties:

- Closed feature set (no extensions or subsetting): The specification must be normative and bounded. The standard must state that a compliant implementation supports the entirety of the base standard and nothing else. The standard must not allow vendor-specific extensions. The standard may define allowable subsets, but must exclude vendor-specific or vendor-defined subsetting. Later versions of a standard need not be 100% backward compatible, but deviations are precisely specified.
- Deterministic Output: The standard must define explicit and invariant requirements around input-to-output mappings. The standard must permit no “implementation defined” behaviors. The standard may permit implementations to set limits on maximum size, capacity, etc., but must require uniform, conforming behaviors within those limits. The standard document uses the word "shall" essentially exclusively, and "may" or "should" in only rare cases (for example, error handling that must be delegated to an external system).
- For standards governing real-time processes, Exhaustive Error Handling: Rather than leaving errors to "implementation-defined" logic, the standard must mandate exact error codes, state transitions, and fallback behaviors to maintain system stability.
- Platform & Vendor Neutrality: The definitions must remain divorced from specific internal system architectures, programming languages, or operating environments.
- Reference implementation: while it is not essential to specify a reference implementation, that is common. The standard may provide for resolution of ambiguities or omissions to ensure uniform implementation. The standard may include a test suite for conformance testing.

== Interoperability and open standards ==
Interoperability implies exchanges between a range of products, or similar products from several different vendors, or even between past and future revisions of the same product. Interoperability may be developed post-facto, as a special measure between two products, while excluding the rest, by using open standards. When a vendor is forced to adapt its system to a dominant system that is not based on open standards, it is compatibility, not interoperability.

=== Open standards ===
Open standards rely on a broadly consultative and inclusive group, including representatives from vendors, academics and others holding a stake in the development, that discusses and debates the technical and economic merits, demerits and feasibility of a proposed common protocol. After the doubts and reservations of all members are addressed, the resulting common document is endorsed as a common standard. This document may be subsequently released to the public, and henceforth becomes an open standard. It is usually published and is available freely or at a nominal cost to any and all comers, with no further encumbrances. Various vendors and individuals (even those who were not part of the original group) can use the standards document to make products that implement the common protocol defined in the standard and are thus interoperable by design, with no specific liability or advantage for customers for choosing one product over another on the basis of standardized features. The vendors' products compete on the quality of their implementation, user interface, ease of use, performance, price, and a host of other factors, while keeping the customer's data intact and transferable even if they choose to switch to another competing product for business reasons.

However, while open is a necessary condition for an interoperability standard, it is not a sufficient condition. For example, the standard-setting processes for the Fortran, C, and C++ languages are open, with a broadly inclusive consultative group. But the resulting standards are not interoperability standards.

=== Post facto interoperability ===
Post facto interoperability may be the result of the absolute market dominance of a particular product in contravention of any applicable standards, or if any effective standards were not present at the time of that product's introduction. The vendor behind that product can then choose to ignore any forthcoming standards and not cooperate in any standardization process at all, using its near-monopoly to insist that its product sets the de facto standard by its very market dominance. This is not a problem if the product's implementation is open and minimally encumbered, but it may well be both closed and heavily encumbered (e.g., by patent claims). Because of the network effect, achieving interoperability with such a product is both critical for any other vendor if it wishes to remain relevant in the market, and difficult to accomplish because of lack of cooperation on equal terms with the original vendor, who may well see the new vendor as a potential competitor and threat. The newer implementations often rely on clean-room reverse engineering in the absence of technical data to achieve interoperability. The original vendors may provide such technical data to others, often in the name of encouraging competition, but such data is invariably encumbered and may be of limited use. Availability of such data is not equivalent to an open standard, because:

1. The data is provided by the original vendor on a discretionary basis, and the vendor has every interest in blocking the effective implementation of competing solutions, and may subtly alter or change its product, often in newer revisions, so that competitors' implementations are almost, but not quite completely interoperable, leading customers to consider them unreliable or of lower quality. These changes may not be passed on to other vendors at all, or passed on after a strategic delay, maintaining the market dominance of the original vendor.
2. The data itself may be encumbered, e.g., by patents or pricing, leading to a dependence of all competing solutions on the original vendor, and possibly leading to a revenue stream from the competitors' customers back to the original vendor. This revenue stream is the result of the original product's market dominance and not a result of any innate superiority.
3. Even when the original vendor is genuinely interested in promoting healthy competition (so that he may also benefit from the resulting innovative market), post-facto interoperability may often be undesirable as many defects or quirks can be directly traced back to the original implementation's technical limitations. Although in an open process, anyone may identify and correct such limitations, and the resulting cleaner specification may be used by all vendors, this is more difficult post-facto, as customers already have valuable information and processes encoded in the faulty but dominant product, and other vendors are forced to replicate those faults and quirks for the sake of preserving interoperability even if they could design better solutions. Alternatively, it can be argued that even open processes are subject to the weight of past implementations and imperfect past designs and that the power of the dominant vendor to unilaterally correct or improve the system and impose the changes to all users facilitates innovation.
4. Lack of an open standard can also become problematic for the customers, as in the case of the original vendor's inability to fix a certain problem that is an artifact of technical limitations in the original product. The customer wants that fault fixed, but the vendor has to maintain that faulty state, even across newer revisions of the same product, because that behavior is a de facto standard and many more customers would have to pay the price of any interoperability issues caused by fixing the original problem and introducing new behavior.

== Government ==
=== eGovernment ===
Speaking from an e-government perspective, interoperability refers to the collaboration ability of cross-border services for citizens, businesses and public administrations. Exchanging data can be a challenge due to language barriers, different specifications of formats, varieties of categorizations and other hindrances.

If data is interpreted differently, collaboration is limited, takes longer and is inefficient. For instance, if a citizen of country A wants to purchase land in country B, the person will be asked to submit the proper address data. Address data in both countries includes full name details, street name and number, as well as a postal code. The order of the address details might vary. In the same language, it is not an obstacle to order the provided address data, but across language barriers, it becomes difficult. If the language uses a different writing system it is almost impossible if no translation tools are available.

=== Flood risk management ===
Interoperability is used by researchers in the context of urban flood risk management. Cities and urban areas worldwide are expanding, which creates complex spaces with many interactions between the environment, infrastructure and people. To address this complexity and manage water in urban areas appropriately, a system of systems approach to water and flood control is necessary. In this context, interoperability is important to facilitate system-of-systems thinking, and is defined as: "the ability of any water management system to redirect water and make use of other system(s) to maintain or enhance its performance function during water exceedance events." By assessing the complex properties of urban infrastructure systems, particularly the interoperability between the drainage systems and other urban systems (e.g. infrastructure such as transport), it could be possible to expand the capacity of the overall system to manage flood water towards achieving improved urban flood resilience.

=== Military forces ===
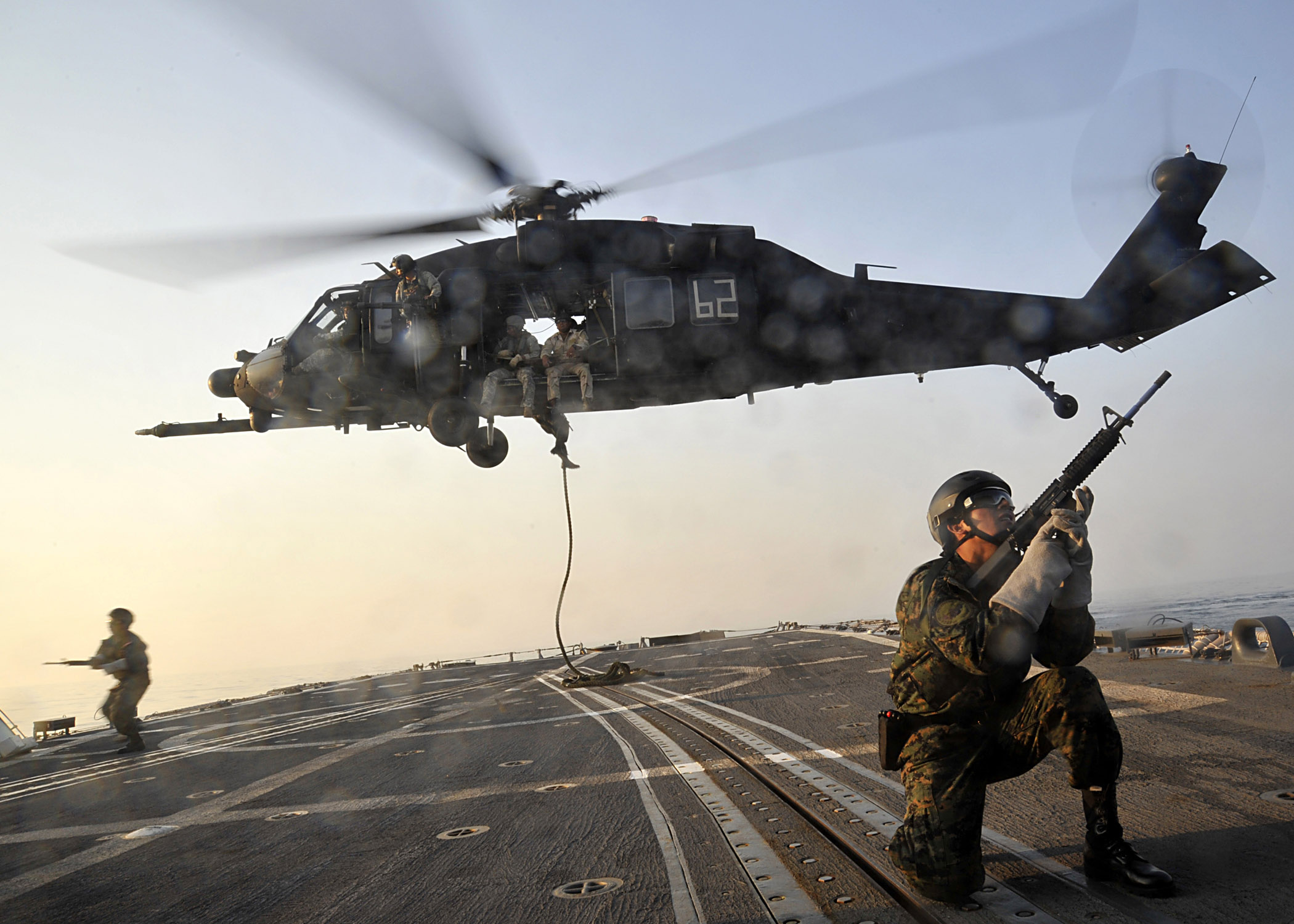
Peruvian special forces fast rope from a UH-60 Blackhawk helicopter operated by United States special operations forces, 2010

Force interoperability is defined in NATO as the ability of the forces of two or more nations to train, exercise and operate effectively together in the execution of assigned missions and tasks. Additionally, NATO defines interoperability more generally as the ability to act together coherently, effectively and efficiently to achieve Allied tactical, operational and strategic objectives.

At the strategic level, interoperability is an enabler for coalition building. It facilitates meaningful contributions by coalition partners. At this level, interoperability issues center on harmonizing world views, strategies, doctrines, and force structures. Interoperability is an element of coalition willingness to work together over the long term to achieve and maintain shared interests against common threats. Interoperability at the operational and tactical levels is where strategic interoperability and technological interoperability come together to help allies shape the environment, manage crises, and win wars. The benefits of interoperability at the operational and tactical levels generally derive from the interchangeability of force elements and units. Technological interoperability reflects the interfaces between organizations and systems. It focuses on communications and computers but also involves the technical capabilities of systems and the resulting mission compatibility between the systems and data of coalition partners. At the technological level, the benefits of interoperability come primarily from their impacts at the operational and tactical levels in terms of enhancing flexibility.

=== Public safety ===
Because first responders need to be able to communicate during wide-scale emergencies, interoperability is an important issue for law enforcement, firefighting, emergency medical services, and other public health and safety departments. It has been a major area of investment and research over the last 12 years. Widely disparate and incompatible hardware impedes the exchange of information between agencies. Agencies' information systems, such as computer-aided dispatch systems and records management systems, functioned largely in isolation, in so-called information islands. Agencies tried to bridge this isolation with inefficient, stopgap methods while large agencies began implementing limited interoperable systems. These approaches were inadequate and, in the US, the lack of interoperability in the public safety realm became evident during the 9/11 attacks on the Pentagon and World Trade Center structures. Further evidence of a lack of interoperability surfaced when agencies tackled the aftermath of Hurricane Katrina.

In contrast to the overall national picture, some states, including Utah, have already made great strides forward. The Utah Highway Patrol and other departments in Utah have created a statewide data sharing network.

The Commonwealth of Virginia is one of the leading states in the United States in improving interoperability. The Interoperability Coordinator leverages a regional structure to better allocate grant funding around the Commonwealth so that all areas have an opportunity to improve communications interoperability. Virginia's strategic plan for communications is updated yearly to include new initiatives for the Commonwealth – all projects and efforts are tied to this plan, which is aligned with the National Emergency Communications Plan, authored by the Department of Homeland Security's Office of Emergency Communications.

The State of Washington seeks to enhance interoperability statewide. The State Interoperability Executive Committee (SIEC), established by the legislature in 2003, works to assist emergency responder agencies (police, fire, sheriff, medical, hazmat, etc.) at all levels of government (city, county, state, tribal, federal) to define interoperability for their local region. Washington recognizes that collaborating on system design and development for wireless radio systems enables emergency responder agencies to efficiently provide additional services, increase interoperability, and reduce long-term costs. This work saves the lives of emergency personnel and the citizens they serve.

The U.S. government is making an effort to overcome the nation's lack of public safety interoperability. The Department of Homeland Security's Office for Interoperability and Compatibility (OIC) is pursuing the SAFECOM and CADIP and Project 25 programs, which are designed to help agencies as they integrate their CAD and other IT systems.

The OIC launched CADIP in August 2007. This project will partner the OIC with agencies in several locations, including Silicon Valley. This program will use case studies to identify the best practices and challenges associated with linking CAD systems across jurisdictional boundaries. These lessons will create the tools and resources public safety agencies can use to build interoperable CAD systems and communicate across local, state, and federal boundaries.

=== As regulator for interoperability ===
Governance entities can increase interoperability through their legislative and executive powers. For instance, in 2021 the European Commission, after commissioning two impact assessment studies and a technology analysis study, proposed the implementation of a standardization – for iterations of USB-C – of phone charger products, which may increase interoperability along with convergence and convenience for consumers while decreasing resource needs, redundancy and electronic waste.

Conversely, government-mandated interoperability has been heavily criticized as leading to monopolies that become too big to fail. For example, the United States Securities and Exchange Commission's implementation of 1975 amendments to the Securities Exchange Act of 1934 that were intended to ensure interoperability was blamed for driving all regional clearinghouses and depositories out of business in the United States. As a result, the National Securities Clearing Corporation is the sole clearinghouse; the Depository Trust Company is the sole repository; and their parent, the Depository Trust & Clearing Corporation, has enormous market power over central counterparty clearing in the United States. In contrast, the federal government of the United States did not attempt to mandate or regulate credit card interoperability. This allowed credit card networks to naturally develop interoperability (in the sense that almost every payment terminal can automatically accept almost every credit card), so that Visa Inc. was not left as the last credit card network standing.

== Commerce and industries ==
=== Information technology and computers ===
==== Desktop ====
Desktop interoperability is a subset of software interoperability. In the early days, the focus of interoperability was to integrate web applications with other web applications. Over time, open-system containers were developed to create a virtual desktop environment in which these applications could be registered and then communicate with each other using simple publish–subscribe patterns. Rudimentary UI capabilities were also supported, allowing windows to be grouped with other windows. Today, desktop interoperability has evolved into full-service platforms that include container support, basic exchange between web and web, but also native support for other application types and advanced window management. The very latest interop platforms also include application services such as universal search, notifications, user permissions and preferences, 3rd party application connectors and language adapters for in-house applications.

==== Information search ====
Search interoperability refers to the ability of two or more information collections to be searched by a single query.

Specifically related to web-based search, the challenge of interoperability stems from the fact that designers of web resources typically have little or no need to concern themselves with exchanging information with other web resources. Federated Search technology, which does not place format requirements on the data owner, has emerged as one solution to search interoperability challenges. In addition, standards, such as Open Archives Initiative Protocol for Metadata Harvesting, Resource Description Framework, and SPARQL, have emerged that also help address the issue of search interoperability related to web resources. Such standards also address broader topics of interoperability, such as allowing data mining.

==== Software ====
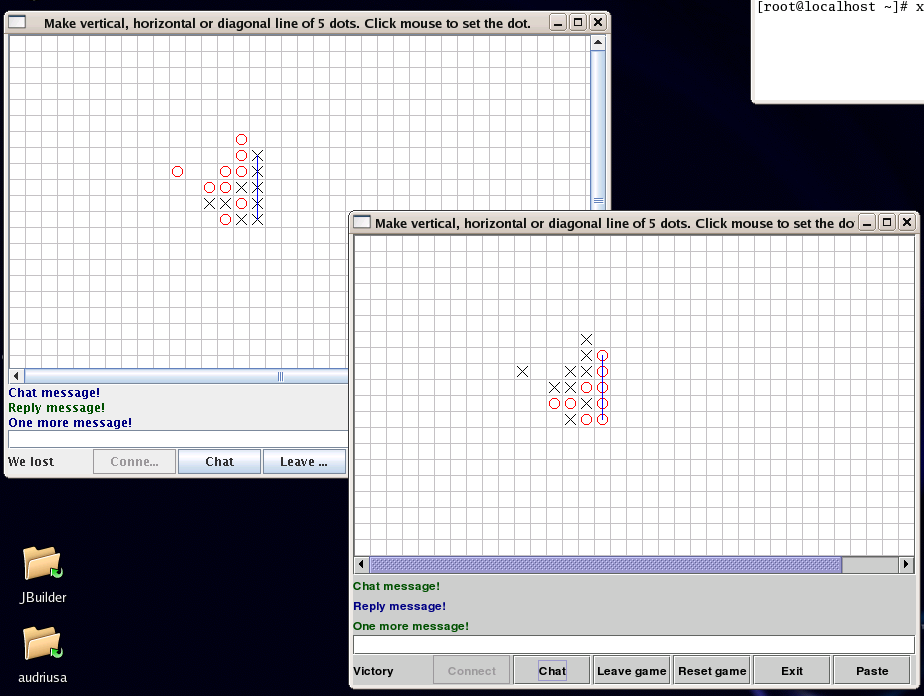
Interoperability: playing the two role network game, when one of the player clients (top left) runs under Sun Microsystems and another under GNU Classpath with JamVM. The applications execute the same bytecode and interoperate using the standard RMI-IIOP messages for communication.

With respect to software, the term interoperability is used to describe the capability of different programs to exchange data via a common set of exchange formats, to read and write the same file formats, and to use the same communication protocols. (Note: The ability to execute the same binary code on different processor platforms is not contemplated by the definition of interoperability.) The lack of interoperability can be a consequence of a lack of attention to standardization during the design of a program. Indeed, interoperability is not taken for granted in the non-standards-based portion of the computing world.

According to ISO/IEC 2382-01, Information Technology Vocabulary, Fundamental Terms, interoperability is defined as follows: "The capability to communicate, execute programs, or transfer data among various functional units in a manner that requires the user to have little or no knowledge of the unique characteristics of those units". (Note: The definition is somewhat ambiguous because the user of a program can be another program and, if the latter is a portion of the set of programs that is required to be interoperable, it might well be that it does need to have knowledge of the characteristics of other units.)

Standards-developing organizations provide open public software specifications to facilitate interoperability; examples include the Oasis-Open organization and buildingSMART (formerly the International Alliance for Interoperability). Another example of a neutral party is the RFC documents from the Internet Engineering Task Force (IETF).

The Open Service for Lifecycle Collaboration community is working on finding a common standard in order that software tools can share and exchange data e.g., bugs, tasks, requirements etc. The final goal is to agree on an open standard for interoperability of open source application lifecycle management tools.

Java is an example of an interoperable programming language that allows for programs to be written once and run anywhere with a Java virtual machine. A program in Java, so long as it does not use system-specific functionality, will maintain interoperability with all systems that have a Java virtual machine available. Applications will maintain compatibility because, while the implementation is different, the underlying language interfaces are the same.

===== Achieving software =====
Software interoperability is achieved through five interrelated ways:

1. Product testing
  Products produced to a common standard, or to a sub-profile thereof, depend on the clarity of the standards, but there may be discrepancies in their implementations that system or unit testing may not uncover. This requires that systems formally be tested in a production scenario – as they will be finally implemented – to ensure they actually will intercommunicate as advertised, i.e., they are interoperable. Interoperable product testing is different from conformance-based product testing as conformance to a standard does not necessarily engender interoperability with another product that is also tested for conformance.
2. Product engineering
  Implements the common standard, or a sub-profile thereof, as defined by the industry and community partnerships with the specific intention of achieving interoperability with other software implementations, also following the same standard or sub-profile thereof.
3. Industry and community partnership
  Industry and community partnerships, either domestic or international, sponsor standard workgroups with the purpose of defining a common standard that may be used to allow software systems to intercommunicate for a defined purpose. At times, an industry or community will sub-profile an existing standard produced by another organization to reduce options and thus make interoperability more achievable for implementations.
4. Common technology and intellectual property
  The use of a common technology or intellectual property may speed up and reduce the complexity of interoperability by reducing variability between components from different sets of separately developed software products and thus allowing them to intercommunicate more readily. This technique has some of the same technical results as using a common vendor product to produce interoperability. The common technology can come through third-party libraries or open-source developments.
5. Standard implementation
  Software interoperability requires a common agreement that is normally arrived at via an industrial, national or international standard.

Each of these has an important role in reducing variability in intercommunication software and enhancing a common understanding of the end goal to be achieved.

===== Language interoperability =====
Language interoperability is the capability of two different programming languages to natively interact as part of the same system and operate on the same kind of data structures.

There are many ways programming languages are interoperable with one another. HTML, CSS, and JavaScript are interoperable as they are used in tandem in webpages. Some object oriented languages are interoperable thanks to their shared hosting virtual machine (e.g. .NET CLI compliant languages in the Common Language Runtime and JVM compliant languages in the Java Virtual Machine).

==== Unified interoperability ====
Unified interoperability is the property of a system that allows for the integration of real-time and non-real time communications, activities, data, and information services (i.e., unified) and the display and coordination of those services across systems and devices (i.e., interoperability). Unified interoperability provides the capability to communicate and exchange processing across different applications, data, and infrastructure.

=== Market dominance and power ===
Interoperability tends to be regarded as an issue for experts and its implications for daily living are sometimes underrated. The European Union Microsoft competition case shows how interoperability concerns important questions of power relationships. In 2004, the European Commission found that Microsoft had abused its market power by deliberately restricting interoperability between Windows Workgroup servers and non-Microsoft work group servers. By doing so, Microsoft was able to protect its dominant market position for work group server operating systems, the heart of corporate IT networks. Microsoft was ordered to disclose complete and accurate interface documentation, which could enable rival vendors to compete on an equal footing (the interoperability remedy).

Interoperability has also surfaced in the software patent debate in the European Parliament (June–July 2005). Critics claim that because patents on techniques required for interoperability are kept under RAND (reasonable and non-discriminatory licensing) conditions, customers will have to pay license fees twice: once for the product and, in the appropriate case, once for the patent-protected program the product uses.

=== Business processes ===
Interoperability is often more of an organizational issue. Interoperability can have a significant impact on the organizations concerned, raising issues of ownership (do people want to share their data? or are they dealing with information silos?), labor relations (are people prepared to undergo training?) and usability. In this context, a more apt definition is captured in the term business process interoperability.

Interoperability can have important economic consequences; for example, research has estimated the cost of inadequate interoperability in the US capital facilities industry to be $15.8 billion a year. If competitors' products are not interoperable (due to causes such as patents, trade secrets or coordination failures), the result may well be monopoly or market failure. For this reason, it may be prudent for user communities or governments to take steps to encourage interoperability in various situations. At least 30 international bodies and countries have implemented eGovernment-based interoperability framework initiatives called e-GIF, while in the US, there is the NIEM initiative.

=== Medical industry ===
The need for plug-and-play interoperability – the ability to take a medical device out of its box and make it work with other devices – has attracted attention from both healthcare providers and industry.

Increasingly, medical devices like incubators and imaging systems feature software that integrates at the point of care and with electronic systems, such as electronic medical records. At the 2016 Regulatory Affairs Professionals Society (RAPS) meeting, experts in the field like Angela N. Johnson with GE Healthcare and Jeff Shuren of the United States Food and Drug Administration provided practical seminars on how companies developing new medical devices and hospitals installing them can work more effectively to align interoperable software systems.

=== Railways ===
Railways have greater or lesser interoperability depending on conforming to standards of gauge, couplings, brakes, signalling, loading gauge, and structure gauge to mention a few parameters. For passenger rail service, different railway platform height and width clearance standards may also affect interoperability.

North American freight and intercity passenger railroads are highly interoperable, but systems in Europe, Asia, Africa, Central and South America, and Australia are much less so. The parameter most difficult to overcome (at reasonable cost) is incompatibility of gauge, though variable gauge axle systems can be used on rolling stock.

=== Telecommunications ===
In telecommunications, the term can be defined as:

1. The ability to provide services to and accept services from other systems, and to use the services exchanged to enable them to operate effectively together. ITU-T provides standards for international telecommunications.
2. The condition achieved among communications-electronics systems or items of communications-electronics equipment when information or services can be exchanged directly and satisfactorily between them or their users. The degree of interoperability should be defined when referring to specific cases.

In two-way radio, interoperability is composed of three dimensions:

- compatible communications paths (compatible frequencies, equipment and signaling),
- radio system coverage or adequate signal strength, and;
- scalable capacity.

== Organizations dedicated to interoperability ==
Many organizations are dedicated to interoperability. Some concentrate on eGovernment, eBusiness or data exchange in general.

=== Global ===
Internationally, Network Centric Operations Industry Consortium facilitates global interoperability across borders, language and technical barriers. In the built environment, the International Alliance for Interoperability started in 1994 and was renamed buildingSMART in 2005.

=== Europe ===
In Europe, the European Commission and its IDABC program issue the European Interoperability Framework. IDABC was succeeded by the Interoperability Solutions for European Public Administrations (ISA) program. They also initiated the Semantic Interoperability Centre Europe (SEMIC.EU). A European Land Information Service (EULIS) was established in 2006, as a consortium of European National Land Registers. The aim of the service is to establish a single portal through which customers are provided with access to information about individual properties, about land and property registration services, and about the associated legal environment.

The European Interoperability Framework (EIF) considered four kinds of interoperability: legal interoperability, organizational interoperability, semantic interoperability, and technical interoperability.

In the European Research Cluster on the Internet of Things (IERC) and IoT Semantic Interoperability Best Practices; four kinds of interoperability are distinguished: syntactical interoperability, technical interoperability, semantic interoperability, and organizational interoperability.

=== US ===
In the United States, the General Services Administration Component Organization and Registration Environment (CORE.GOV) initiative provided a collaboration environment for component development, sharing, registration, and reuse in the early 2000s. A related initiative is the ongoing National Information Exchange Model (NIEM) work and component repository. The National Institute of Standards and Technology serves as an agency for measurement standards.

== See also ==
Computer and information technology

- Architecture of Interoperable Information Systems
- List of computer standards
- Model Driven Interoperability, framework
- Semantic Web, standard for making Internet data machine readable

Business

- Business interoperability interface, between an organization's systems and processes
- Enterprise interoperability, ability to link activities in an efficient and competitive way

Other

- Collaboration, general concept
- Polytely, problem solving
- Universal Data Element Framework, information indexing
