= August-Wilhelm Scheer =

German businessman

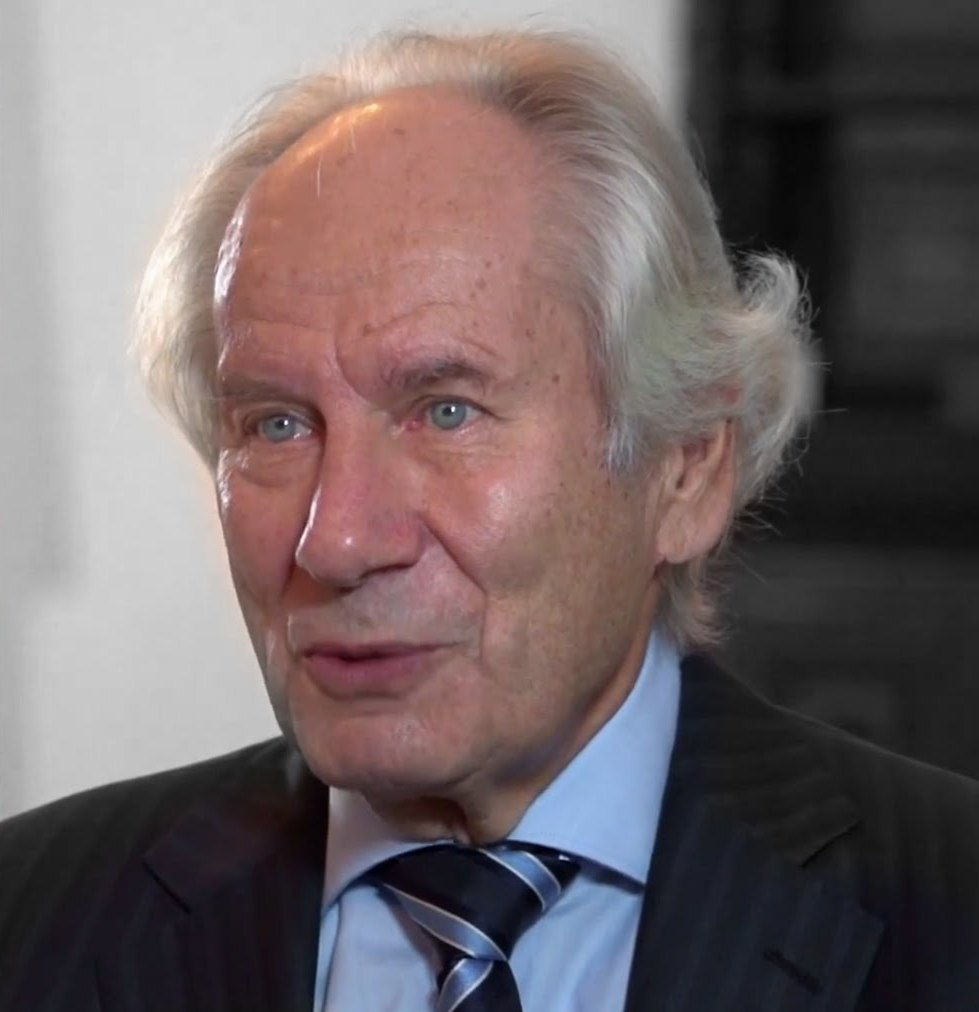
August-Wilhelm Scheer, 2014

August-Wilhelm Scheer (born July 27, 1941) is a German Professor of business administration and business information at Saarland University, and founder and director of IDS Scheer AG, a major IT service and software company. He is known for the development of the Architecture of Integrated Information Systems (ARIS) concept.

== Biography ==
In 1972 Scheer received a PhD from University of Hamburg with the thesis "Kosten- und kapazitätsorientierte Ersatzpolitik bei stochastisch ausfallenden Produktionsanlagen". In 1974 he obtained his Habilitation also in Hamburg with a thesis about project control.

In 1975 Scheer took over one of the first chairs for information systems and founded the institute for information systems (IWi) at Saarland University, which he led until 2005. In 1984 he founded IDS Scheer, a Business Process Management (BPM) software company, which is widely regarded as the founder of the BPM industry. In 1997 he also founded IMC AG, a company for innovative learning technologies and spin-off of Saarland University, together with Wolfgang Kraemer, Frank Milius and Wolfgang Zimmermann.

In 2003 Scheer was awarded the Philip Morris Research Prize and the Ernst & Young Entrepreneur of the Year Award. In December 2005 he was awarded the Erich Gutenberg price and in the same month the Federal Cross of Merit first class. In 2005 he was also elected as a fellow of the Gesellschaft für Informatik. Since 2006, he has been a member of the council for innovation and growth of the Federal Government. 2007 he was honored as a HPI-Fellow by the Hasso-Plattner-Institut (HPI) für Softwaresystemtechnik and was elected President of the German Association for Information Technology, Telecommunications and New Media.

On June 4, 2010 Scheer was awarded with the Design Science Lifetime Achievement Award at University of St. Gallen. He received the prize as a recognition for his contribution to design science research.

== Work ==
His research focuses on information and business process management in industry, services and administration.

=== ARIS ===
Model of the ARIS Framework

The Architecture of Integrated Information Systems (ARIS) concept, which is the representation of business processes in diagrammatic form so as to provide an unambiguous starting point for the development of computer-based information systems. The ARIS architecture and methodology is the core piece of intellectual property business process management software company IDS Scheer was founded on.

=== Event-driven Process Chain ===
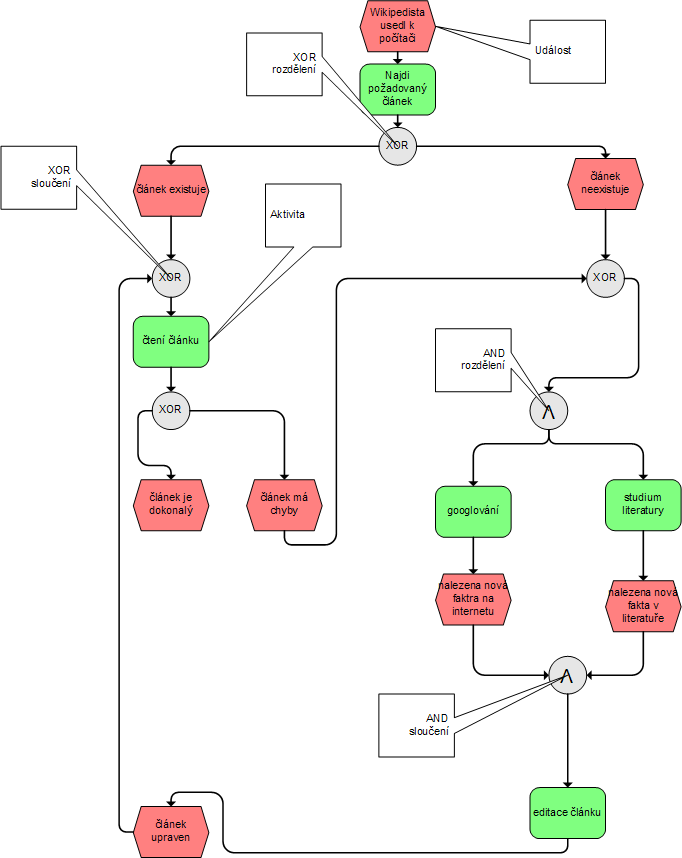
An EPC diagram

Event-driven Process Chain is a business process modelling technique, mainly used for analysing processes for the purpose of an ERP implementation.

Businesses use EPC diagrams to lay out business process work flows, originally in conjunction with SAP R/3 modeling, but now more widely. There are a number of tools for creating EPC diagrams, including ARIS Toolset of IDS Scheer AG, free modeling tool ARIS Express by IDS Scheer AG, ADONIS of BOC Group, Visio of Microsoft Corp., Semtalk of Semtation GmbH, or Bonapart by Pikos GmbH. Some but not all of these tools support the tool-independent EPC Markup Language (EPML) interchange format.

There are also tools that generate EPC diagrams from operational data, such as SAP logs. EPC diagrams use symbols of several kinds to show the control flow structure (sequence of decisions, functions, events, and other elements) of a business process.

== Publications ==
His publications attract worldwide attention and were translated in 8 languages. A selection:

- 1969. Industrielle Investitionsentscheidung. Eine theoret. u. empir. Untersuchung z. Investitionsverhalten in Industrieunternehmungen.
- 1978. Projektsteuerung.
- 1984. EDV-orientierte Betriebswirtschaftslehre
- 1985. Computer, a challenge for business administration
- 1989. Enterprise-wide data modelling : information systems in industry
- 1990. CIM-Strategie als Teil der Unternehmensstrategie
- 1992. Architecture of integrated information systems : foundations of enterprise modelling.
- 1994. Business process engineering : reference models for industrial enterprises.
- 1994. CIM : computer integrated manufacturing : towards the factory of the future.
- 1998. SAP R/3 in der Praxis : neuere Entwicklungen und Anwendungen. With Dieter B. Pressmar.
- 1998. ARIS—business process modeling
- 2003. Business process change management : ARIS in practice. Edited with others.
- 2006. Agility by Aris business process management : Yearbook business process excellence. Edited with others.
- 2006. Corporate performance management : ARIS in practice
- 2016. The Complete Business Process Handbook Volume 1: 'Body of Knowledge from Process Modeling to BPM
