= NCOIC =

NCOIC may refer to:

- Non-Commissioned Officer in Charge, an individual in the enlisted ranks of a military unit who has limited command authority over others in the unit
- Network Centric Operations Industry Consortium, an international not-for-profit, chartered in the United States
