= Institute for Management Information Systems =

Austrian research institution

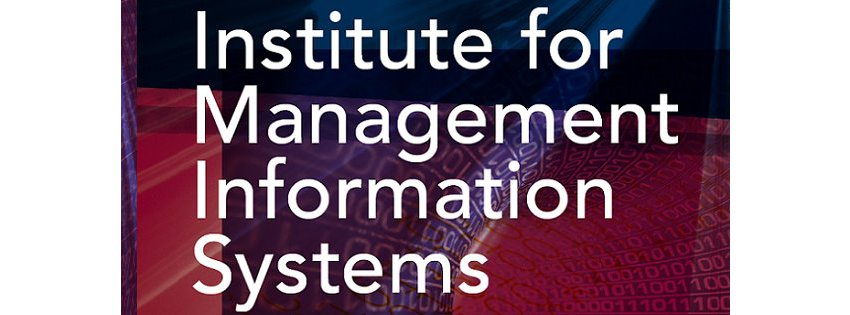
- Motto: "Our research mission is to investigate and design technologies to enhance their social compatibility and long-term marketing success."
- Established: 1978
- Head: Sarah Spiekermann
- Location: Vienna, Austria
- Website: www.wu.ac.at/ec/

The Institute for Management Information Systems is a research institution of the Department of Information Systems and Operations, at the Vienna University of Economics and Business (WU). The WU is the largest university having a business and economics focus in Europe. The master's program "Information Systems" provided by the department is ranked 4th by "The Eduniversal Best Masters Ranking" in Western Europe.

== History ==
The institute was founded by Univ.Prof. Dr. Dr. h.c. Hans Robert Hansen in 1978 who chaired it for over 30 years. In early days, the development of industry oriented reference models for electronic commerce was the research and teaching emphasis. In 2009, Univ. Prof. Dr. Sarah Spiekermann has taken over the chair of the institute. Up to the present, the research focus is on ethical computing, privacy issues in the information society, as well as context-aware systems and ubiquitous computing.

== Research ==
The research mission of the institute is to design and investigate technologies that enhance social compatibility and long-term market success. The social compatibility of IT systems references the ability of IT systems to support basic human values and rights. These values and rights include privacy, security, autonomy, system control and calmness. Together with industry partners and international political institutions, the institute develops technical policies and procedures to ensure that designers consider these rights and values when they develop systems. The institute's conceptual and technical work is informed and supported by the analysis of economic conditions, which are given in the form of international markets for personal information, a trend towards automation, decision delegation as well as Internet economics. Furthermore, social and psychological dimensions of IT usage and acceptance are considered. Taken together, the institute follows a three-dimensional research approach, allowing for and using technical, economic and social methods of analysis. A wide range of methods to contribute to the development of a "sustainable" technology landscape is applied. The institute is a think tank for business and society that focuses on the sustainable design of information technology. As a think tank, it contributes its work to international policy-relevant processes.

== Teaching ==
=== Bachelor's program ===
In the common body of knowledge, the institute offers two introductory courses to Management Information Systems. First, Business information systems 1 (BIS 1) is dealing with the fundamentals of business informatics. Second, Business information systems 2 (BIS 2) puts an emphasis on modelling business processes with software tools such as ARIS.

The specialization "Management Information Systems" serves the need of second- and third-year students. After an introduction to the basics of every-day computing, data structures of the semantic web and ERP systems (e.g., Microsoft Dynamics) are discussed. In the following, students can specialize in e-commerce or easily usable business programming tools. The following courses are covered in the specialization.

- Foundations of ICT
- ERP systems
- B2B E-Commerce
- E-Government
- Business Programming 1
- B2C E-Commerce
- Business Programming 2
- Ski seminar (winter)
- IT consulting
- Privacy and security

=== Master's program ===
In the master's program "Information Systems" the institute's goal is the training of IT managers rather than informing the IT - knowledgeable economist. These executives, who will also be responsible for the implementation of new information systems, shall be educated to promote sustainable system development. In the master's common body of knowledge, the institute offers a training in user-centered system design. Building on these foundations, the competence field "Sustainable IT" carries the institute's research activities into the classroom. In turn, students in the competence field's core seminars "Ethical Computing" and "Privacy and Security" give impulses for the research questions raised.

== Publications ==
The institute has contributed 881 publications to the community by June 26, 2012.

=== Wirtschaftsinformatik 1 ===
Prof. Hansen and Prof. Neumann published and regularly updated "Wirtschaftsinformatik 1", which is used as a reference book in the German-speaking academic field and has been sold almost 500 000 times.

== Events and Media ==
=== ITalks ===
IT Talk is a debating platform which invites experts and thought leaders to discuss and reflect current IT-related topics.

=== Blog "ethical machine" ===
The head of the institute, Univ. Prof. Dr. Sarah Spiekermann composes ethical reflections concerning the role of IT and society in the online version of the Austrian newspaper "Der Standard".
