= Oracle BPA Suite =

Oracle Business Process Analysis (BPA) Suite is a group of Oracle Corporation software products that provide modeling and analysis of business processes.

The suite is based on the IDS Scheer software Architecture of Integrated Information Systems (ARIS) Design Platform after an agreement between the two organizations in 2006.

== Components ==
- Business Process Architect
- Business Process Repository
- Business Process Simulator
- Business Process Publisher

== See also ==
- Oracle SOA Suite
