= Amparito Roca =

1925 composition by Jaime Teixidor

Amparito Roca is a 1925 composition by Spanish musician and composer Jaume Teixidor (1884–1957). It is named it after one of his piano students, then 12-year-old Amparito Roca (1912–1993).

It was first performed in September 1925 in the El Siglo theater in the town of Carlet, where the composer lived at the time. It is a pasodoble and one of the better known pieces of Spanish music around the world.

The score was published in Madrid later in 1925 by Música Moderna, and then in Barcelona by Joaquim Mora in 1928. Boosey & Hawkes published it in 1935 in two arrangements by Aubrey Winter (1870–1955), one for wind band and one for brass band.

A Spanish-language book, Amparito Roca, El Pasadoble Del Mestre Teixidor has been published under the auspices of the Ajuntament De Carlet, Valencia. It contains biographical material and commentary on the works of Teixidor with a catalogue and discography. The text is by Angel Valero Garcia.

It has been suggested that Amparito Roca (also published as Amparita Roca) was actually composed by British bandmaster Reginald Clifford Ridewood (1907-1942), who composed several pasodobles after being stationed at Gibraltar. "The assumption is that after Ridewood failed to apply for the copyright, Teixidor re-scored the paso doble for Spanish bands and then reissued it as Amparito Roca under copyright as his composition." This is patently false. Amparito Roca was first performed in 1925 when Ridewood was only 17, and he was not assigned to Gibraltar until 1930.
