= IMC Process Guide =

imc Process Guide is the name of an electronic performance support system (EPSS). The software is developed by e-learning company IMC AG, Saarbrücken.

== Application areas ==
Authors use the so-called "designer component" to create help texts for applications and functions and define process steps. These help texts can be updated with a few clicks if software or processes are changing. On user side, the contents are automatically retrieved via a "Guide", as soon as a function is used with a help text archived. The "Guide" can also be opened selectively to lead through an application or process. This context sensitive help through texts, links and videos is intended to reduce the number of errors in everyday work, especially rarely run processes. In particular, this applies for complex processes or software updates.

== Design and user interface ==
The user interface is based on the Programme Office 2013 by Microsoft. An inbuilt social feedback function allows users to record their screen and send it directly to the help desk. The Process Guide is also available via software as a Service, a part of Cloud Computing.
