= IDS Scheer =

IDS Scheer Consulting GmbH
- Type: Public
- Industry: Information Technology
- Founded: 1984
- Founder: Dr. August-Wilhelm Scheer
- Headquarters: Saarbrücken, Saarland, Germany
- Area served: Worldwide
- Key people: Rudolf Keul, Josef Bommersbach
- Parent: Scheer Group GmbH
- Website: https://www.scheer-group.com/

IDS Scheer was a software company that developed, marketed, and supported Business Process Management (BPM) software. It has been regarded as the founder of the BPM industry. The company was established in 1984 by August-Wilhelm Scheer who also served as supervisory board chairman and Chief Technology Advisor, as a spin-off from the Institute for Information Systems. The company was centered around selling products and services based on Dr. Scheer's early Y-Model, developed in the 1980s . In 2009 it was acquired by Software AG.

IDS Scheer had a dominant BPM market-share in Europe and was considered well-positioned in the US market based on its partnerships with Microsoft, SAP, HP, Oracle, IBM and TIBCO as well as consistent financial success and numerous favorable reports from Gartner, Forrester, and AMR Research. However, the company is less well known in the US market, warranting some in the US to call IDS Scheer a "better kept secret."

Its product held the unique distinction of being embedded in the products of SAP, Oracle, and Microsoft. End-user markets for IDS Scheer included consumer packaged goods, chemicals, pharmaceuticals, papers, metals, retail and textile industries.

== History ==
IDS Scheer was founded in 1984 to market the Y-Model reference framework developed by Dr. Scheer in the 1980s. The Y-Model helped users identify and classify processes and was originally the foundation of IDS Scheer's products. A "Y" symbol is still in the company's logo today as a representation of the Y-Model.

The company went IPO on the Frankfurt exchange in 1999. By the end of its first year as a public company, IDS Scheer had 87.1 million euro in annual revenue and had developed and sold the ARIS architecture it's known for today. The company grew rapidly from 87.1 to 220 million euro in revenue from 1999 to 2003 and up to nearly 400 million euro by 2008. IDS Scheer acquired German-Swiss consulting firm Balink in 2004 and Russian consultancy Business Logic in January 2005.

The company continues to fuel an aggressive expansion today, including the opening of offices in Australia, Croatia, and Shanghai from 2004–2007. By 2007, the company had almost 3,000 employees, over half of which were devoted solely to consulting.

Software AG agreed to buy IDS Scheer for €487 million in July 2009. The takeover was cleared by competition authorities in October 2009.

In 2010, August-Wilhelm Scheer created a new company named Scheer Group to provide consulting services in DACH region. Scheer Group acquired SAP Consulting practice from Software AG in DACH region and created a new unit called IDS Scheer Consulting GmbH on 1 April 2014. Today IDS Scheer Consulting continues to provide services on ARIS product.

== Name ==
The firm was originally called "IDS Prof. Scheer Gesellschaft für integrierte Datenverarbeitungssysteme mbH", was then shortened to IDS Scheer. IDS stands for Integrated Data-processing Systems.

The current (2012) name is "IDS Scheer Consulting GmbH".

== See also ==
- Architecture of Integrated Information Systems (ARIS)
- free modeling tool ARIS Express by IDS Scheer
- Oracle BPA Suite
