= Pasodoble =

Music genre and dance

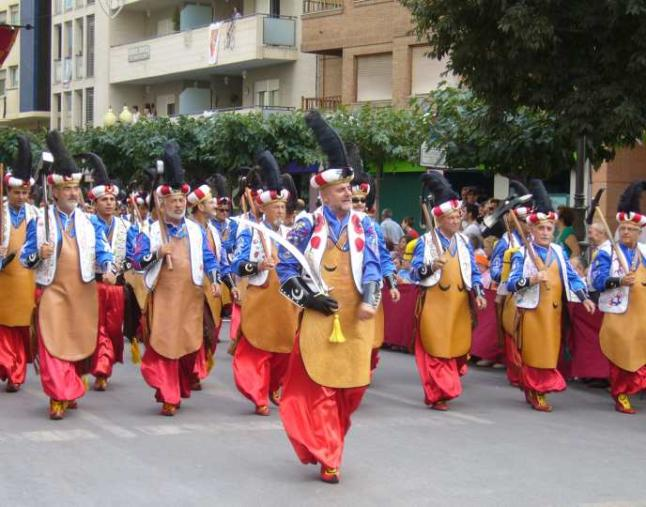
Festeros parading pasodoble as a military march

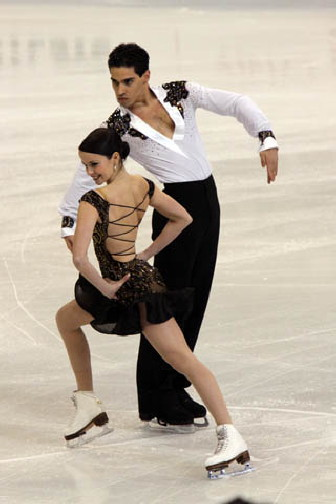
Pasodoble on ice: Luca Lanotte & Anna Cappellini

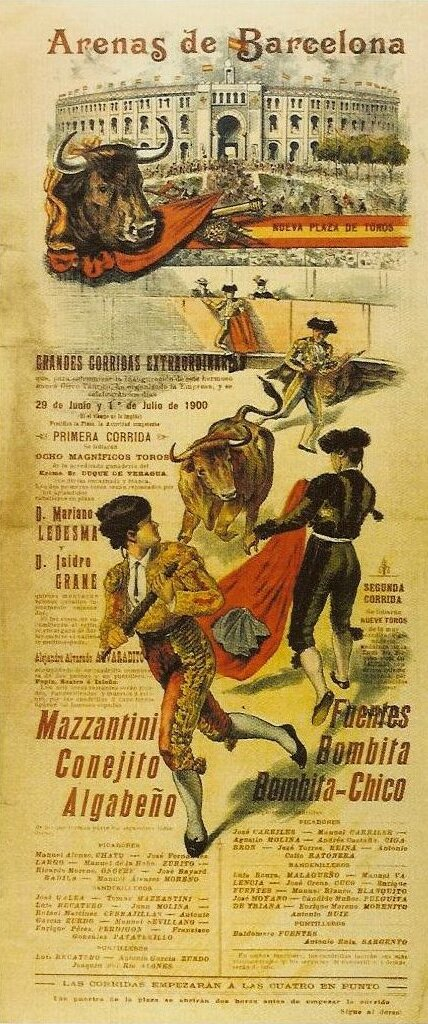
Poster for a bullfight in Barcelona

Pasodoble (Spanish: double step) is a fast-paced Spanish military march used by infantry troops. Its speed allowed troops to give 120 steps per minute (double the average of a regular unit, hence its name). This often was accompanied by a marching band, and as a result of that, the military march gave rise to a modern Spanish musical genre and partner dance form. Both voice and instruments, as well as the dance then began to develop and be practiced independently of marches, and also gained association with bullfighting due to the genre being popular as an instrumental music performed during bullfights. Both the dance and the non-martial compositions are also called pasodoble.

Pasodoble is generally associated with the tonadilla escénica, a theatrical musical form that was used in Spain as an ending to entremeses and staged dances in the first half of the 19th century, and later as a musical interlude between acts of comedies.

== Structure ==
Pasodobles are usually in binary form. Its musical structure consists of an introduction based on the dominant chord of the piece, followed by a first fragment based on the main tone and a second part, called "the trío", based on the sub-dominant note, based yet again on the dominant chord. Each change is preceded by a brieph. The last segment of the pasodoble is usually "the trío" strongly played. The different types of pasodoble – popular, taurino, militar – can vary in rhythm, with the taurino being the slowest and the popular being faster and often incorporating voice. Pasodoble as we know it started in Spain but is now played in a wide variety of Hispanic nations. Each region has developed its own subgenre and personal style of pasodoble, adjusting some formal aspects of the structure to fit their local musical tradition. In modern Spain, the most prolific composition of pasodobles takes place on the Valencian coast, associated with the festivals of Moors and Christians and the Fallas.

The dance form is very free regarding figures. The dancers must remain one in front of the other, and keep their bodies parallel to each other at all times, leaning slightly to the left. They must give one step per tempo. The left hand of the male and the right hand of the woman must remain united almost permanently. Besides this, almost all motions and figures are accepted, which allows space for dramatization. The dance can be similar to the one-step, except for the speed and number of steps given.

== History ==
The origin of this form of music is disputed.

The facts known about it from historical evidence are that it was written as early as the 18th century, since Spain has pasodoble scores dating back to 1780; that it was incorporated into comedies and adopted as a regulatory step for the Spanish infantry; and that the music was not introduced into bullfights until the 19th century.

One hypothesis suggests, based on the etymology of the name, that it comes from the French "pas-redouble", a form of speedy march of the French infantry during the late 18th century. It is claimed to have both Spanish and French characteristics. The modern steps often contain French terms, but the dance resembles the nature of the bullfight. It is said to have emerged from southern French culture during the 1930s. Supporters of this hypothesis, mostly French musicologists, suggested that pasodoble was a way for the French to portray the techniques used in Spanish bullfights. This hypothesis fails to explain the existence of scores dating from 1780 and the fact that Spanish infantry marched at double speed before the French army did. And French musicologists focus on the movements and themes related to bullfighting, but in Spain the pasodoble was not associated with bullfighting until much later.

In the United States of America it became popular only as a dance in the 1930s, in the form taught by French ballroom dance schools. That tradition associated this Spanish music with French stereotypes of Spanish traditions and bullfighting, so that the pasodoble is viewed as a French ballroom dance rather than a Spanish military march.

One hypothesis infers from the dance's free figures, binary rhythm, and moderated movement that it originated from traditional Spanish music and dances of the early 16th century. These dances, developed around 1538, were a gradual combination of Castilian music and dance (seguidillas) with the garrotín, a fast and repetitive Romani couples dance, adapted into a march form.

The musicologist José Subirá considers that the style has it origin in a combination of military marches and light music from Spanish popular theatre, which gradually permeated the entremeses of more respectable plays.

=== Others ===
Famous bullfighters have been honored with pasodoble tunes named for them. Other tunes have been inspired by patriotic motifs or local characters. The pasodoble is well-known and used today for dance competitions.

During the early 20th century, the pasodoble became part of the repertoire of Italian American musicians in San Francisco playing in the ballo liscio style. Four pasodobles were collected by Sidney Robertson Cowell for the WPA California Folk Music Project in 1939 by Mexican American wedding party band on mandolin, guitar, and violin.

== Types ==
=== By objective ===
==== March pasodoble ====
Also called "military pasodoble", it was created as, or keeps its role as, an infantry march. It is usually fast and lacks lyrics. Famous examples are "Soldadito español", "El Abanico", "Los nardos", "Las Corsarias" and "Los Voluntarios".

==== Taurine pasodoble ====
These are often played during bullfights, or with that intense atmosphere in mind. Like the pasodobles militares, they lack lyrics, but they are slower and more dramatic. This pasodoble is based on music played at bullfights during the bullfighters' entrance (paseo), or during the passes (faena) just before the kill. Many have been composed to honor outstanding bullfighters. Some of the most famous are "Suspiros de España", "España cañí", "Agüero", "La Gracia de Dios", "El Gato Montés", "Viva el pasodoble", "Tercio de Quites", "Pan y toros", "Cielo Andaluz", "La Morena de mi Copla", "Francisco Alegre", "Amparito Roca", "El Beso" and "Plaza de las Ventas".

==== Popular pasodoble ====
Intended for dancing in popular celebrations and social reunions, populares tend to be upbeat, but can also be emotional and introspective, with the occasional melancholic or patriotic theme. They usually require a small number of instruments and musicians and have lyrics. Some famous examples are "Islas Canarias", "En el Mundo", "Costa Dorada" and "Valencia".

==== Band pasodoble ====
These require an entire band to be played, and are designed almost exclusively for popular parades and village celebrations. They often use colorful characters of the region and light-hearted subjects as inspiration. These pasodobles are very much alive in Spain today, with the largest source of new pasodobles being the southeast of Spain, particularly the Valencian Community, related to the popular Moors and Christians festivals. The traditional ones can be heard in Spanish popular celebrations, patron saint verbenas, and weddings. Well-known examples are "Paquito el Chocolatero", "Fiesta en Benidorm", "Alegría Agostense" and "Pirata Quiero Ser".

==== Display pasodoble ====
This dance performed mostly for spectacle purposes, sometimes in a bullfighting ring. This pasodoble may or may not have lyrics, but it often adapts other styles of pasodoble and just changes the dancing to make it more spectacular for the public – often tourists. Essentially, this pasodoble dance involves role-playing. This two-person dance form has the man performing as the bullfighter and the woman as the cape. It is known as one of the fastest Latin ballroom dances because dancers make around 120 to 130 beats/steps per minute. Flamenco-like qualities infuse the dance as the man and woman challenge each other.

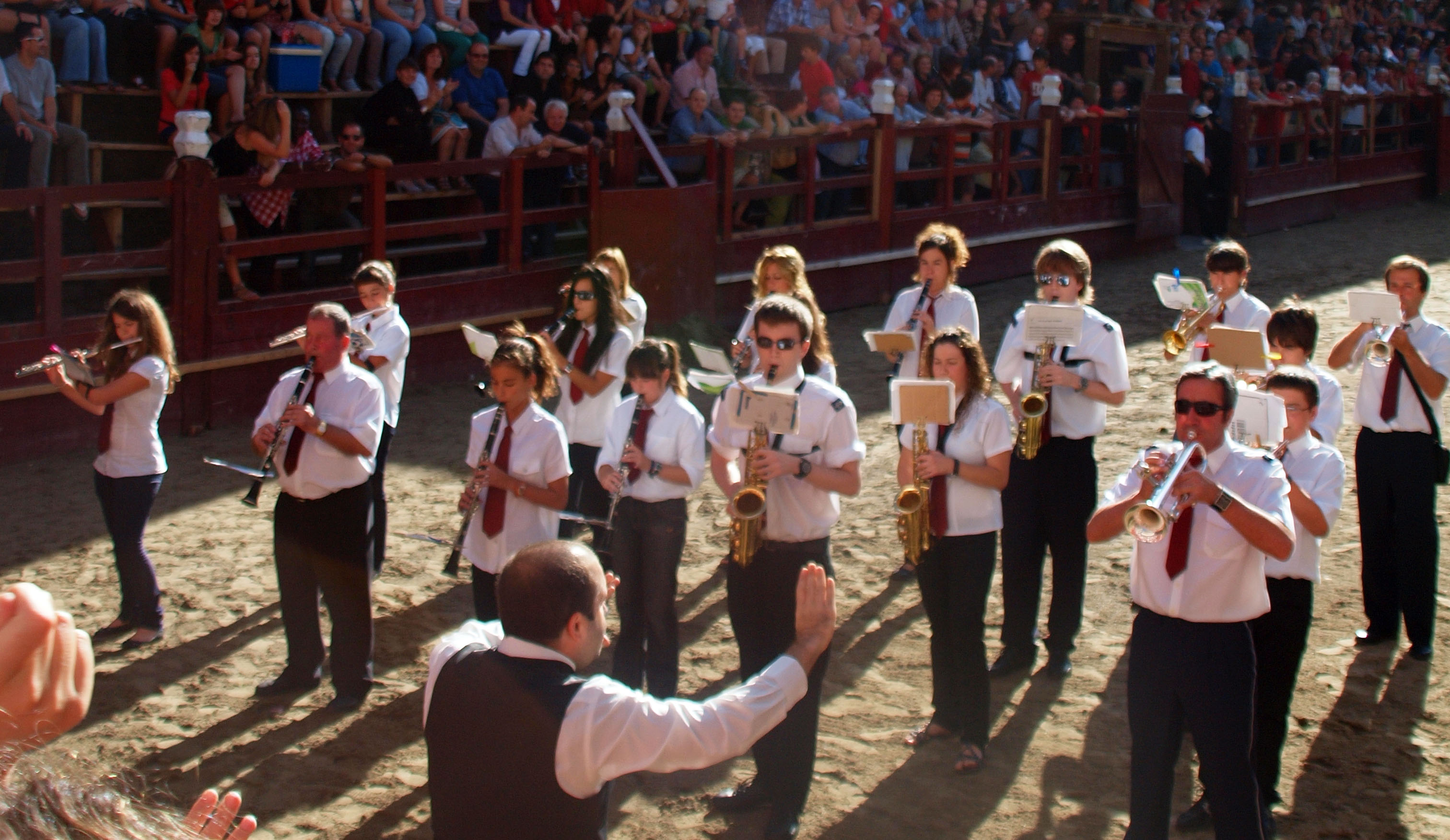
Amparito Roca being played by a wind band

The leader of this dance plays the part of the matador. The follower generally plays the part of the matador's cape, but can also represent the shadow of the matador, as well as the flamenco dancer in some figures. The follower never represents the bull, although this is a common misconception. This form of pasodoble is a lively style of dance set to the duple meter march-like music, and is often performed in the context of theater. This form of pasodoble was mistakenly taken as the original form by English and French musicologists visiting Spain in the 20th century.

==== Tunas ====
Tunas is the name given to a brotherhood of students that play popular music together on the street to get some extra coins, or under the window of the beloved of one of them, to try to help the lovestruck member to get a date with her. Tunas have become one of the main forces keeping Spanish pasodoble alive. Tunas tend to adapt or repeat simple pieces that are already composed, but they sometimes compose their own satirical pieces.

=== By region ===
In addition to the Spanish pasodoble, already discussed, this rhythm has been adopted and modified by other nations:

==== Mexican pasodoble ====
Mexico has produced master composers of pasodoble, especially taurine pasodobles. Agustín Lara or Silverio Pérez. Some of the best known Mexican pasodobles are

El Piti, El Charro Cárdenas, El abuelito, El banderillero, María Caballé, El Berrendito de San Juan, Tarde de toros, Toros en San Miguel, Joselito Huerta and Toros de Llaguno.

==== Puerto Rican pasodobles ====
Puerto Rican pasodobles are known for their nostalgic quality. Some of the most famous are: Ecos de Puerto Rico (El Maestro Ladi), Morena (Noro Morales), Cuando pienso en España (Juan Peña Reyes), Reminiscencias (Juan Peña Reyes), El trueno (Juan Peña Reyes), Himno a Humacao (Miguel López), Sol andaluz (Manuel Peña Vázquez).

==== Colombian pasodobles ====
Pasodoble is not as popular in Colombia as in other countries, but the Colombia pasodoble, "Feria de Manizales", is an emblematic piece. It was composed in 1957, with lyrics by Guillermo González Ospina and music by Juan Mari Asins inspired by the Spanish classic "España cañí". This pasodoble is based on the development of a parade and a dance with every single "Queen of the city" of Manizales, and it lasts one week.

==== Spanish pasodobles ====
- Amparito Roca
- El Beso
- La Entrada
- El gato montés ("Wild Cat") from the opera of the same name
- El Relicario
- No te vayas de Navarra
- Agüero
- España cañí ("Gypsy Spain")
- Islas Canarias named after Canary Islands.
- La Gracia de Dios
- Feria de Manizales (unofficial hymn of the Colombian City, Manizales)
- Manolete, named after Manolete, bullfighter killed due to a fatal goring (1947).
- La Morena de mi Copla
- Plaza de las Ventas
- Paquito el Chocolatero. The tune has a dance of its own.
- Sombreros y Mantilles
- Suspiros de España
- Que Viva España
- Valencia
- La Virgen de la Macarena
- Pasodoble hace salir el sol (The pasodoble makes the sun come up)

=== Ballroom ===
Many pasodoble songs are variations of España cañí. The song has breaks or "highlights" in fixed positions in the song (two highlights at syllabus levels, three highlights and a longer song at open levels). Highlights emphasize music and are more powerful than other parts of the music. Usually, dancers strike a dramatic pose and then hold position until the end of the highlight. Traditionally, pasodoble routines are choreographed to match these highlights, as well as the musical phrases. Accordingly, most ballroom pasodoble tunes are written with similar highlights (those without are simply avoided in competition).

Because of its heavily choreographed tradition, ballroom pasodoble is danced mostly competitively, almost never socially, or without a previously learned routine. That said, in Spain, France, Vietnam, Colombia, Costa Rica and some parts of Germany, it is danced socially as a led (unchoreographed) dance. In Venezuela, pasodoble is almost a must-have dance in weddings and big parties. It became especially famous thanks to the hit song "Guitarra Española" by Los Melódicos.

This dance gained popularity in the US in 1930. It was too difficult to achieve widespread popularity. All moves are sharp and quick. Pasodoble takes up a lot of space, limiting it to special occasions.

In competitive dance, modern pasodoble is combined with other four dances (samba, cha-cha-cha, rumba and jive) under the banner International Latin. Modern pasodoble dance consists of two dancing parts and one break in between for dancers of class D and of three parts and two breaks in between for dancers of class C, B, A, according to the IDSF classification. Dancers of lower than D-class usually perform only four official dances of the Latin-American Program, that excludes pasodoble.

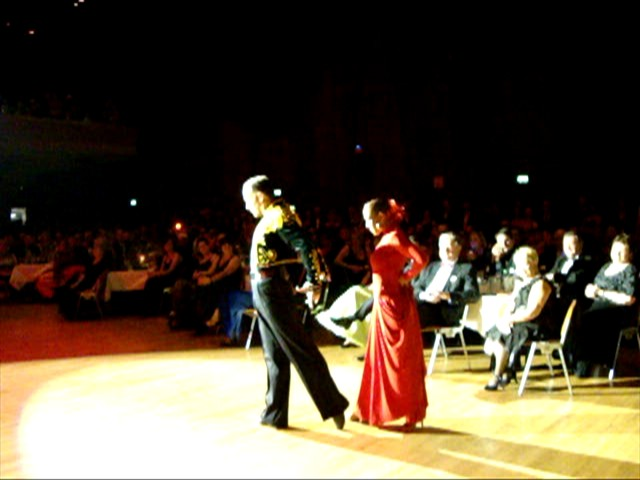
Pasedoble Galaball2011

== See also ==
- Military step
- Latin dance
- Moros y cristianos
