= Cross-domain interoperability =

Interact of systems in different domains

Cross-domain interoperability exists when organizations or systems from different domains interact in information exchange, services, and/or goods to achieve their own or common goals. Interoperability is the method of systems working together (inter-operate). A domain in this instance is a community with its related infrastructure, bound by common purpose and interests, with consistent mutual interactions or rules of engagement that is separable from other communities by social, technical, linguistic, professional, legal or sovereignty related boundaries. The capability of cross-domain interoperability is becoming increasingly important as business and government operations become more global and interdependent. Cross-domain interoperability enables synergy, extends product utility and enables users to be more effective and successful within their own domains and the combined effort.

Cross-domain interoperability is characterized by common understanding and agreements on both sides of a domain boundary that enable individual organizations to tailor or make their products, assets or services interoperable within the larger community. Each participant accepts and enforces use of mutual, domain-wide or worldwide standards and interface protocols. Consequently, cross-domain interfaces may not be under the control of any single element or authority -- unlike an integrated system-of-systems environment where one domain or its authority may control the interfaces to be used between domains.

Two examples of activities that can benefit when information systems are interoperable across domains are disaster response work (such as the 2013 typhoon relief in Philippines) and multi-national peacekeeping missions (such as the Allied Forces support of France during the 2012–2013 conflict in Mali). Another effort where cross-domain interoperability will be critical to overall success is implementation of the U.S. Affordable Care Act, in which federal and state governments, insurance companies and healthcare providers perform their individual functions using a variety of networks and divergent computer platforms – an interoperable environment will enable participants in these different domains to effectively exchange information and perform their essential services, while protecting the privacy and rights of individual patients during the exchange. The healthcare-related community has begun to focus on establishing cross-domain interoperability, but not yet on a large-scale basis.

Cloud computing promotes communication and collaboration, but connecting to the Internet and migrating information to a cloud or group of clouds does not guarantee cross-domain interoperability. Just because the organizations are all connected to the Internet does not mean that cross-domain interoperability automatically happens. Eliminating technological barriers and enabling information sharing and collaboration involves not only designing and building computer programs and environments so they interoperate, but also having cooperative agreements in place regarding management and administrative policies governing issues such as security, user identification, trust and information assurance. Internal policies and government regulations also have an impact and can either promote or impede cross-domain interoperability. To establish cross-domain interoperability, there needs to be a spirit of cooperation among the different participants, and domains must have agreed-to standards, translations and other interface conversions that enable each entity to exchange information and extract the data it needs in order to perform its role and to contribute knowledge that adds value to the overall mission.

A number of organizations, businesses, and institutions work on the technology and policies to make cross-domain interoperability a reality, including National Institute of Standards and Technology, United States Department of Defense, NATO, and Network Centric Operations Industry Consortium (NCOIC). NCOIC has a number of resources for government and industry to foster cross-domain interoperability, including the open process, NCOIC Rapid Response Capability (NRRC™), which was first designed for the National Geospatial-Intelligence Agency.
