= Business interoperability interface =

Approach to business co-operation

A business interoperability interface (BII) is an interface that enables business interoperability between organizational systems. The term was coined by the European Commission in the European Interoperability Framework where such interfaces are recommended to improve the interoperability of public administrations that internally use different standards.

Though the BII description of the European Commission remains vague, the following requirements are described: The BII should describe entry and exit points to the internal business processes of an organization and it should describe the contribution and commitments the collaboration partners require from each other in a formal way. Furthermore, the BII should enable the enactment of collaborative business processes and interconnect the business processes of different organizations. This description implies that the main objective of the BII is to describe to collaboration partners how they can interact with an organization.

== Interface ==
An interface represents the point of interconnection between two systems or subsystems. Since collaborative business always comprises interactions between organizational systems (e. g. enterprises or departments), interfaces are an essential element in the development of collaborative business processes. In the context of organizations working together, interface descriptions should describe those characteristics of a system that are relevant for adjacent systems. While interfaces in information systems formerly concentrated on technical aspects, e.g. by describing Application Programming Interfaces, recent developments like Service-oriented Architecture shifted the attention to conceptual interfaces aiming at a business-level description of services and organizational boundaries.

== Business interoperability ==
In a similar vein it was argued, that previous interoperability definitions focused too much on technical aspects. In consequence, the term Business Interoperability was proposed, for example defined as "the organizational and operational ability of an enterprise to cooperate with its business partners and to efficiently establish, conduct and develop IT-supported business relationships with the objective to create value". Interoperability is usually understood as the capability of autonomous systems "to exchange information and be able to use it", or simply put: the capability of an autonomous system to work together or to collaborate. Since "working together" of autonomous organizations means that they execute a collaborative business process, Business Interoperability can also be defined as
... the capability of autonomous organizations to execute a collaborative business process among them.

== Definition ==
Based on the definitions of business interoperability and interface, the term BII can be defined as follows:

The Business Interoperability Interface of an organization comprises all information that is relevant for partner organizations in order to enact a collaborative business process with the organization. The interface comprises those elements of a collaborative business process, which are provided by the organization itself, as well as the elements, the organization expects from partner organizations.

The BII contents are not restricted to process descriptions: in order to enact a collaborative business process, the collaboration partners do not only need to know the sequence in which activities are executed but also require complementary information like organizational roles, specifics of individual activities or document types. Likewise, the description of the BII should cover different levels of technical granularity, since the systematic enactment of collaborative business processes requires models on both the business and the technical level.

== Implementations ==
An EU-research project, aiming at improving interoperability between European public administrations, delivered a proposal for designing and implementing a Business Interoperability Interface, which was later refined in scientific publications.

The illustration summarizes the idea of this BII implementation: Organization A and B each has an internal/private view on its information system. From this internal model, they derive a view for their collaboration partner. For example, in the public process of Organization A, only those activities of the private process from Organization A are comprised which are relevant for the collaboration partner (i.e. Organization B). All these public elements are then bundled in the BII where a collaboration partner can read them. If the elements of adjacent BII-elements fit together and all collaboration partners agreed on how to interpret them, they are also called global elements.

Concept for a Business Interoperability Interface

The BII described there tackles four enterprise dimensions: In the organization dimension, roles, units and other organization elements relevant for the collaboration are described and related to internal elements. This ensures for example, that the collaboration partners have a common understanding of the interacting roles. In the data dimension, document types used in the collaboration are defined and related to internally used document types. In the function dimension, business functions and services offered in the collaboration are described. In the process dimension, the processes that each organization offers are described, as well as how these public processes are related to adjacent processes of partner organizations.
