= IMC AG =

German company

imc AG is a German software company and supplier of E-Learning content with headquarters in Saarbrücken.

== Development ==
The company imc information multimedia communication AG was founded in 1996 within the Scheer Group of the Saarland, by business informatics professor and former BITKOM President August-Wilhelm Scheer as a spin off to bundle the E-learning business and to expand. August-Wilhelm Scheer is the Head of the Supervisory Board.

In June, 2014, Wolfgang Kraemer, Frank Milius, and Volker Zimmermann, founding Board members, left the company after 17 years. Their Successors were Christian Wachter, Tobias Blickle and Rudolf Keul. Blickle and Keul left the company in 2017.

The company's main product is a Learning management system (LMS). The LMS is the technical basis of the 2011 introduced free access MOOCS platform OpenCourseWorld.

In 2014, the IT Journal CHIP placed OpenCourseWorld under the three best MOOCS platforms in the German speaking world together with Coursera and iversity.

2013, the company moved with 170 employees in the new building of the Scheer towers on the University campus North of the University of the Saarland. Other locations are Munich, Freiburg, Essen, Graz (Austria), Zürich (Switzerland), Sibiu (Romania), London (United Kingdom), Singapore and Melbourne (Australia).
