= Function tree =

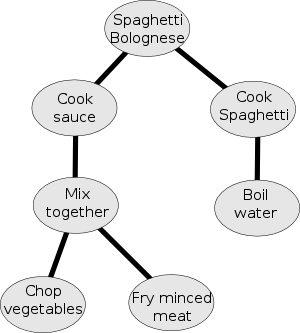
A function tree for spaghetti bolognese

In the theory of complex systems, a function tree is a diagram showing the dependencies between the functions of a system. It breaks a problem (or its solution) down into simpler parts, allowing the design and development to be more focused and efficient.

When used in computer programming, a function tree visualizes which function calls another.
