= Carlet =

Spanish municipality

- Municipality
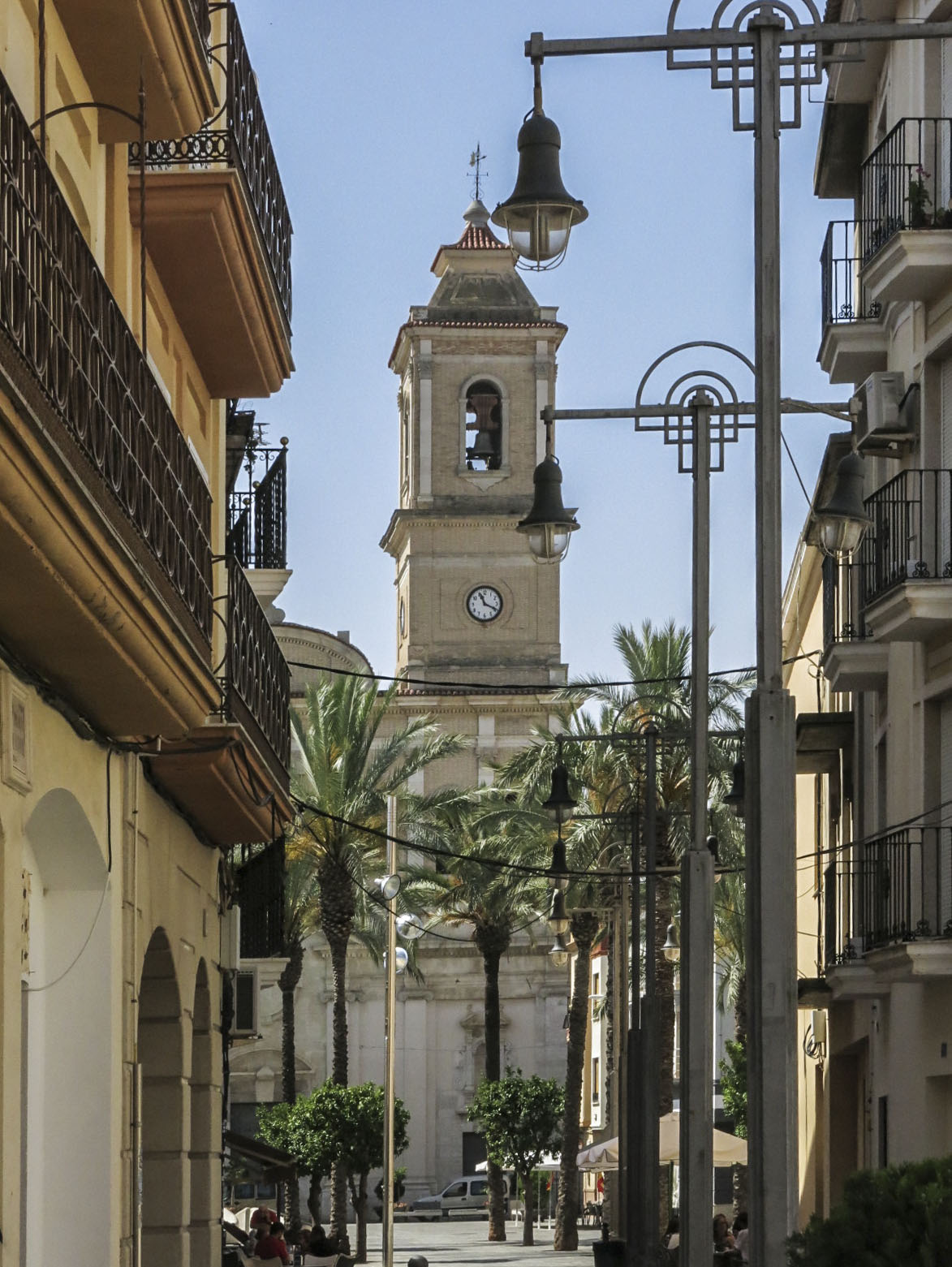
- Bell tower of the Church of the Assumption

- Coat of arms

- Location of Carlet in the Valencian Community Location of Carlet in Spain
- Coordinates: 39°13′35″N 0°31′16″W
- Country: Spain
- Autonomous community: Valencian Community
- Province: Valencia
- Comarca: Ribera Alta

Government
  - Mayor: Laura Sáez Martínez (PP)

Area
  - Total: 45.6 km^{2} (17.6 sq mi)
- Elevation: 48 m (157 ft)

Population (2025)
  - Total: 16,857
  - Density: 370/km^{2} (957/sq mi)
- Demonym(s): carletí, carletina
- Time zone: UTC+1 (CET)
  - Summer (DST): UTC+2 (CEST)
- Postal code: 46240
- Dialling code: (+34) 96
- Website: www.carlet.es

Carlet is a municipality in the comarca of Ribera Alta in the Valencian Community, Spain.

== Main sights ==
Hermitage of San Bernat is a chapel built above the Muslim king's palace who tortured his son Bernardo and his two daughters, María and Gracia, for having converted to Christianity. It is a building of a centralized floor formed by a double structure, created by an outer heptagon that involves the interior and circular floor. Above the interior zone is a dome with Arabic tiles in blue, characteristic of the Valencian domes.

== See also ==
- List of municipalities in Valencia
