= Network Centric Operations Industry Consortium =

International standards adoption organization

Network Centric Operations Industry Consortium - NCOIC
- NCOIC Logo
- Company type: Non-profit
- Industry: Telecommunications
- Founded: 2004; 22 years ago
- Key people: Harry D. Raduege, chief executive officer

The Network Centric Operations Industry Consortium (NCOIC) is an international not-for-profit, chartered in the United States, whose goal is to facilitate the adoption of cross-domain interoperability standards. Formed in September 2004, the organization is composed of more than 50 members and advisors representing business, government organizations and academic institutions in 12 countries.

NCO is the application of the fundamental tenets of network-centric warfare to aspects of national security, especially industry support for the missions of both the United States Department of Defense and the Department of Homeland Security (DHS). NCOIC does not only subscribe to the military use of this theory, but also works to apply NCO and interoperability across nations and industries, including emergency response, health care, aerospace, information technology cyber security & cloud computing, energy and financial services.

NCOIC's technical teams have developed resources to further the use of network-centric systems and interoperability in both the public and private sectors. These resources – including processes, tools, frameworks, patterns, principles and databases—are available free of charge on the NCOIC website. They are aimed at helping an organization lower engineering costs, speed program implementation, increase capability and reduce risk. The consortium also provides training and services such as interoperability demonstrations, acquisition strategies, evaluations and verification.

NCOIC focuses on four interdependent areas in identifying solutions that will enable cross-domain interoperability: business, culture, governance and technical. The interaction, influence and impact of factors—such as financial objectives, business goals, laws and regulations, and cultural considerations – are all taken into account when planning and/or implementing technology change.

== Key Technical Resources ==
Systems, Capabilities, Operations, Programs, & Enterprises (SCOPE) Model • The SCOPE interoperability assessment model is designed to characterize interoperability-relevant aspects or capabilities of a system or set of systems over a network in terms of a set of dimensions and values along those dimensions.

NCOIC Interoperability Framework (NIF) • The NIF is a development framework that helps system architects and system engineers to embed interoperability elements throughout the life cycle of programs, beginning with requirements. Whenever possible, those resources are based upon standards.

Net Centric Patterns • NCOIC Net Centric Patterns contain prescriptive recommendations on approaches and standards in specific interoperability domains.

Network Centric Analysis Tool (NCAT) • NCAT is a collaborative, web-enabled questionnaire-based tool developed to assist NCOIC teams and member companies to enhance the likelihood and reduce the time and effort of member companies developing interoperable systems consistent with customers' policies and guidelines, reference models and architectures. It is also available in an excel format.

NCOIC QuadTrangle • The QuadTrangle™ developed by the Network Centric Operations Industry Consortium shows the four, interdependent areas that must be considered when developing a reliable and trusted interoperable environment: business, culture, governance and technical.
