= ARIS Express =

Modeling tool for business analysis

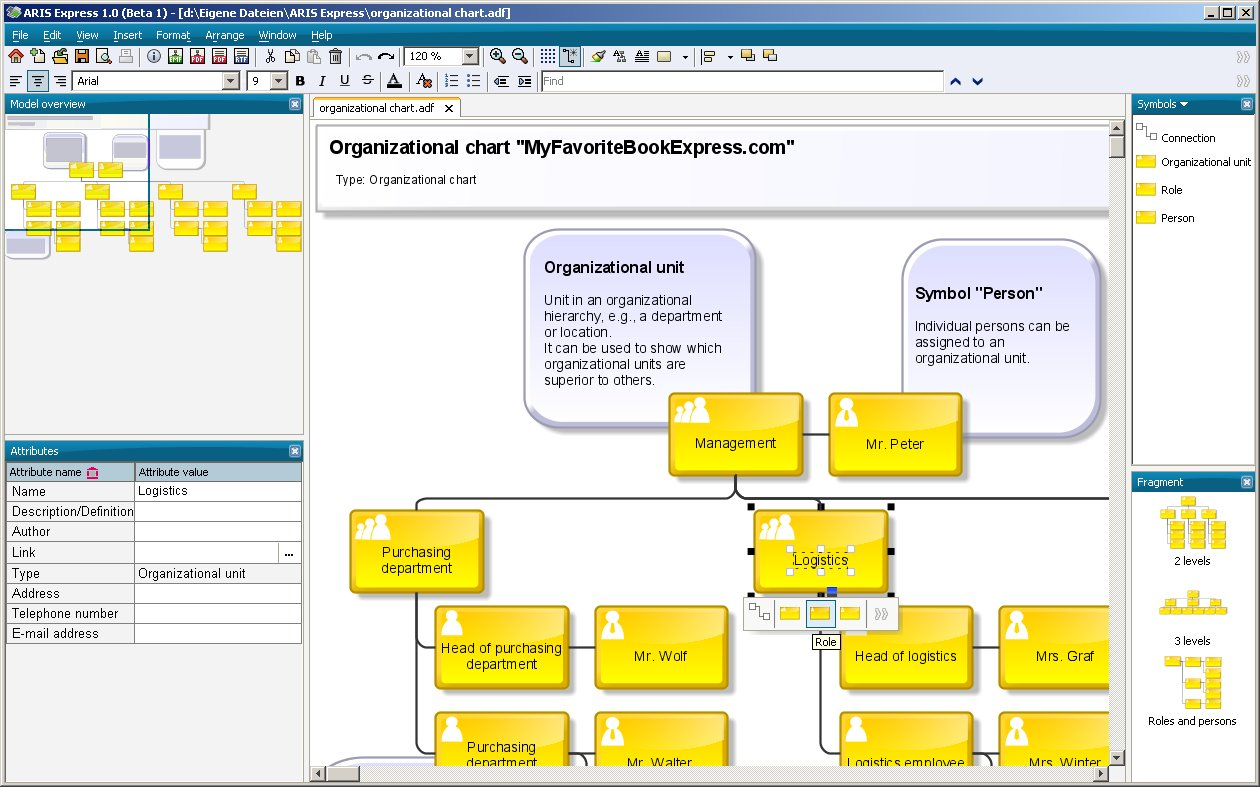
- A screenshot of ARIS Express 1 showing organisational chart
- Developer: Software AG
- Release: 2009
- Stable release: 2.4d / June 29, 2017; 9 years ago
- Written in: Java
- Operating system: Windows (Unofficially supported on Mac OS X and Linux)
- Available in: English, German
- Type: Diagramming software
- License: Freeware
- Website: www.ariscommunity.com/aris-express

ARIS Express is a free-of-charge modeling tool for business process analysis and management. It supports different modeling notations such as BPMN 2, Event-driven Process Chains (EPC), Organizational charts, process landscapes, whiteboards, etc. ARIS Express was initially developed by IDS Scheer, which was bought by Software AG in December 2010. The tool is provided as freeware on the ARIS Community webpage. ARIS Express is notable - having been mentioned in research published by Schumm, Garcia, Krumnow and Greenwood amongst others.

== History ==
ARIS Express was first announced on April 28, 2009 in a press release by IDS Scheer. The first release was on July 28, 2009 in a public beta test on ARIS Community. Only people, who registered before for the beta test were allowed to download and test this beta version. This closed beta test was followed with another public beta test.

The official release of ARIS Express 1.0 was on September 9, 2009. In this first stable version, features such as Microsoft Visio import were added, which were not present in the version for the public beta test.

On February 26, 2010, ARIS Express 2.0 was released. Major changes compared to version 1.0 include BPMN 2 support, integrated spellchecking and ARISalign integration.

On May 25, 2010, version 2.1 of ARIS Express was released. This update improves BPMN 2 support, provides a new online help system for instant feedback, better ARISalign integration and some new symbols in different diagrams. Along with the release, a poster showing the most important modeling concepts supported by ARIS Express was released. In addition, an executable setup is provided for Microsoft Windows-based systems. Beginning of July, an update was released as ARIS Express 2.2, providing bug fixes only. ARIS Express version 2.2 is the current stable release.

An official press release published mid of August 2010 said there are more than 50,000 downloads of ARIS Express.

On February 2, 2011, version 2.3 of ARIS Express was released. This new version changes the file format of ARIS Express so that models can be shown in an interactive model viewer in ARIS Community. The release announcement contained no details about additional features or changes.

== Functionality ==
=== Overview ===
ARIS Express is a standalone single-user application. It is divided in a home screen and a modeling environment. The home screen is used to create new models or open recently edited ones. The modeling environment is used to edit diagrams.

=== Supported notations ===
The following notations are supported by ARIS Express. Users can create diagrams containing an unlimited number of modeling objects.

- BPMN 2 Collaboration Diagrams
- Event-driven Process Chains (EPC)
- Organizational charts
- Process landscape (value-added chain diagram)
- Data model in ERM notation
- IT infrastructure (network diagram)
- System landscape (component diagram)
- Whiteboard
- General diagram

=== Noteworthy features ===
Besides common features such as creating new diagrams, saving them as files or adding objects to the modeling canvas, ARIS Express also provides some noteworthy features, which can't be found in most comparable modeling tools.

- fragments - Often used modeling constructs such as an exclusive decision in a process model can be stored as fragments so that they are available for direct reuse in another model.
- smart designs - The flow of a process model or hierarchies of other models can be captured in a spreadsheet-like interface. While entering the data in the spreadsheet, the model is generated and laid out in the background while typing.
- mini toolbar - While moving the mouse pointer over an object in a diagram, a small toolbar is shown allowing quick access to the most important modeling actions.
- Microsoft Visio import - Diagrams created with Microsoft Visio 2007 or above can be imported to and edited in ARIS Express. A Microsoft Visio export is not provided.
- ARISalign import - Models created on the online collaboration platform ARISalign can be opened and edited in ARIS Express.

=== Exports ===
ARIS Express can export diagrams to different formats such as:

- PDF
- JPEG
- PNG
- EMF
- ADF

ADF is the file format of ARIS Express. The professional tools of ARIS Platform are able to import diagrams stored in the ADF format. Yet, there are major limitations during import - namely, each object in diagram will be treated as unique object, despite having same type and name, forcing redrawing large sections of diagrams after import.

Besides export formats, it is also possible to use the clipboard to copy and paste an ARIS Express diagram into typical office suites such as Microsoft PowerPoint.

== Technology ==
ARIS Express is a Java-based application, which shares some of the features of ARIS Platform products such as ARIS Business Architect and ARIS Business Designer. In contrast to ARIS Platform products, ARIS Express doesn't use a central database for model storage. Instead, each diagram is stored in an ADF file.

ARIS Express uses Java Web Start. After download, the application can be started immediately without installation procedure. For Microsoft Windows based systems, an ordinary setup is provided, too. ARIS Express requires Java 1.6.10 or above. On first startup, the user must enter a valid ARIS Community account to register the application. Creating an ARIS Community account is free-of-charge. After installation, no Internet connection is needed to use ARIS Express.

ARIS Express uses a mechanism provided by Java Web Start to automatically update the application as soon as a new version becomes available and the user is connected to the Internet during startup. There are reports that this automated update failed while upgrading from version 1.0 to version 2.0.

As ARIS Express is based on Java Web Start, it can be installed on any platform supported by Java. The ARIS Community and other Internet sources have reports of successful deployment of ARIS Express on other operating systems than Microsoft Windows. However, ARIS Express is officially supported only on Microsoft Windows.

== Miscellaneous ==
A quick reference sheet is available for ARIS Express. The poster shows all supported diagrams plus the most important modelling concepts for each supported modelling language.

ARIS Express contains a hidden game, a so-called Easter Egg. The game can be started by clicking several times on the product logo in the about dialog. Highscores achieved in the game can be submitted to a special page in ARIS Community.

A Firefox Personas is available for ARIS Express.

== See also ==
- Process mining
