= Banking Industry Architecture Network =

Non-profit organization

- Type: Registered association (e.V.)
- Industry: Banking
- Headquarters: Frankfurt, Germany
- Area served: Worldwide
- Website: bian.org

The Banking Industry Architecture Network e.V. (BIAN) is an independent, member owned, not-for-profit association to establish and promote a common architectural framework for enabling banking interoperability. It was established in 2008.

BIAN's goal is to establish a semantic framework to identify and define IT services in the banking industry. The underlying architectural pattern originates from a service-oriented architecture (SOA).

The community focuses on creating a standard semantic banking services landscape, while ensuring consistent service definitions, levels of detail and boundaries. This will enable banks to achieve a reduction of integration costs and use the advantages of a service-oriented architecture of implementing commercial off-the-shelf (COTS) software.

Financial institutions, software vendors, and system integrators, along with technology partners, are invited to join the association and play a collaborative role with other industry leaders in defining, building and implementing next-generation banking platforms.

== Mission ==
Banks are facing challenges that will eventually force them to decompose their business and IT landscape into independent but interlinked units and are therefore looking for better means of interaction in their systems.

The banking environment consists of many legacy systems that have, over the years, grown in complexity and become increasingly inflexible.

BIAN is defining a common framework as a base for a shared service-oriented catalogue for the banking industry with the goal of establishing a common language. Based on broad consensus from within the banking industry, this will enable faster, more efficient strategic and operational changes in banks.

To assist and guide the banking industry in achieving an architecture closely aligned with business objectives, leading banks are sharing their requirements for core services with leading software and services vendors to implement these services based on formally defined semantics. BIAN is a global, open, independent body where banks, software providers, and system integrators openly exchange banking IT requirements with regard to interaction and integration.

== Strategy ==
BIAN brings banks, vendors of banking applications, and service providers together as a community to achieve synergies by collaborating on a consensus understanding of the requirements for banking enterprise services within an SOA framework and a formal description of a banking services landscape canonical definitions.

Employing an architectural framework to foster proper definition of services, BIAN will help banks and providers move from proprietary to broadly accepted and standardized services. BIAN also represents a repository of non-proprietary knowledge and experience dedicated to supporting the roadmaps for all banks moving towards SOA.

BIAN will offer the industry assistance in:

- Standards: a definition of IT standards for SOA in banking ensures the highest degree of efficiency. Standards do not mean that everything is identical though. They simply form the foundation for future oriented services that offer a maximum level of flexibility in the banking industry.
- Agility: standards provide the greatest opportunity for banks to adapt quickly and efficiently to changing market conditions and demands.
- Flexibility: interoperability between IT systems through widely agreed standards ensures the highest degree of efficiency, by enabling banks to quickly adjust to meet changing needs and new challenges in a constantly evolving industry.
- Evolution: change is a constant, also in business, which includes banking and IT. BIAN members from the IT industry who actively participate in the evolutionary process of the banking industry will also find themselves better positioned as their own markets evolve.
- Cost reduction: it is safe to say that all businesses would agree that increased flexibility in their operations, the ability to adapt and react efficiently to change, and the importance of maintaining a future-oriented approach to their industry and business model are beneficial. The reason is simple: All of these aspects serve to reduce costs while simultaneously improving service. BIAN thus considers cost reductions one of the primary goals of its efforts.

== BIAN standards ==
The BIAN standards are provided from the BIAN working groups. BIAN working groups collaborate, sharing knowledge and experience around SOA for the banking industry with a current focus on core systems. The working groups focus on defining services within an agreed overall common services landscape.

=== Service definitions ===
BIAN is focused on semantic definitions only. Definition of business functional services for retail banking, private banking and corporate banking.

=== Architecture ===
In the stream Architecture BIAN defines the appropriate guidelines and methodologies and all the concepts to ensure consistent services:

- The BIAN Service Landscape as an architectural framework for banks
- Methodologies and guidelines
- Service quality
- Service definition

== The BIAN service landscape ==
The BIAN Service Landscape is a reference framework that categorizes and organizes BIAN Service Domains for ease of access. Different criteria can be used to classify and organize Service Domains that would result in different layouts of the standard set of BIAN Service Domains. BIAN uses a ‘primary’ Service Landscape view based on agreed categorizations that have been refined in use by the BIAN membership.

The BIAN Metamodel is a detailed and comprehensive UML model that defines all the BIAN design structures – it is fully documented elsewhere in its own guide (The BIAN Metamodel). The Metamodel has three elements that capture the design of the BIAN Service Landscape.

1. Business Area - is the highest-level classification. A business area groups together a broad set of business capabilities. For the BIAN Service Landscape they are defined to be aspects of business activity that have similar supporting application and information-specific needs.
2. Business Domain – at the next level, business domains define a coherent collection of capabilities within the broader business area. In the BIAN Service Landscape the business domains are associated with skills and knowledge recognizable in the banking business.
3. Service Domain – is the finest level of partitioning, each defining unique and discrete business capabilities. The Service Domains are the ‘elemental building blocks’ of a service landscape. The Service Domain relates to generic capabilities that do not vary in their scope, but the definitions of the Business Domain and Business Area are classifications that are specific to a particular Service Landscape layout. The Service Landscape layout can be varied depending on use.

== Relations with other standards bodies ==
BIAN is in partnership with independent standards bodies such as Object Management Group (OMG) and The Open Group and IFX Forum. In addition, BIAN has a ‘category D liaison’ with the International Organization for Standardization (ISO), for ISO 20022 semantic models. BIAN incorporates when possible the work of these organizations. As an example, the BIAN Metamodel is closely aligned to, and draws on parts of, the ISO20022 Meta Model for many of the detailed definitional aspects. These working partnerships mark a big step forward in BIAN’s commitment to complimentary standards collaboration.

The TOGAF standard and the BIAN standard are mapped to each other. The leverage of the BIAN deliverables in the context of the TOGAF Architecture Development Method (ADM) is further elaborated. For each step in an architecture development process, the integration of BIAN deliverables is described.

== BIAN members ==
Members of BIAN drive the banking industry by understanding the requirements and trends as well as by designing and providing new IT-solutions therefore. The association lives by the participation of its members. BIAN members contribute actively in the association. However the degree of involvement can vary according to multiple aspects. Influencing for the involvement are e.g. the role within BIAN, specific working topics and the current projects within BIAN and the own company.

== BIAN Banking Architecture Foundation certificate ==
BIAN has defined a certification visible at the certification body (Van Haren Certify) The BIAN Banking Architecture Foundation Certification program. Targeted at banking architects. It evaluates their knowledge of BIAN and their capability to implement it in their solutions.

The exam doesn't have a prerequisite and candidates can take it after taking courses or self-study. It is 60 multiple-choice questions in one hour, with a passing score of 70%. The certificate is valid for two years since passing the exam.
