= Triune continuum paradigm =

The triune continuum paradigm (triune: "both three and one at the same time") is a paradigm for general system modeling published in 2002. The paradigm allows for building of rigorous conceptual frameworks employed for systems modeling in various application contexts (highly tailored as well as interdisciplinary).

== Overview ==
As stated in the Cambridge Dictionary of Philosophy: "Paradigm, as used by Thomas Kuhn (The Structure of Scientific Revolutions, 1962), refers to a set of scientific and metaphysical beliefs that make up a theoretical framework within which scientific theories can be tested, evaluated and if necessary revised."

The triune continuum paradigm holds true to this definition by defining a set of scientific principles within which conceptual frameworks used for system modeling in different contexts can be built, tested, evaluated, and revised.

For an existent modeling framework, the paradigm allows the framework to be tested against its principles, showing framework deficiencies, if any, explaining how to fix the deficiencies in a possible revision of the framework. When building a new system modeling framework, the paradigm provides guidelines on how to do so, assuring the resulting quality of the framework.

According to Herrera et al., the triune continuum paradigm is a complete theoretical base that can be used for building or for improving modern modeling frameworks that are employed for system modeling in different contexts, in particular in software development and in the engineering of enterprise information systems.

== Foundations and their implications ==
The triune continuum paradigm is based on three theories: on Tarski's theory of truth, on Russell's theory of types, and on the theory of the triune continuum. The theories, when applied to general system modeling, produce three principles:

- The first principle assures coherency and unambiguity within modeling interpretations of a single modeling framework.
- The second principle assures internal consistency of descriptions and specifications that are constructed with the aid of a modeling framework.
- The third principle allows to introduce and to justify the minimal set of modeling concepts that is necessary and sufficient to cover the representation scope of a modeling framework on the most abstract level (on the level that corresponds to the first order propositions in Russell's theory of types).

== Applications of the paradigm ==
The triune continuum paradigm can be applied in practice either to improve an existing system modeling framework or to design a new system modeling framework for a given purpose.

- RM-ODP

The paradigm was applied in the domain of software and systems engineering, to formalize foundations of Reference Model of Open Distributed Processing (RM-ODP) conceptual framework. As described by Dijkman, Naumenko in 2002 defined an abstract syntax for RM-ODP in a language called Alloy that uses a set theoretic formal semantics.

- UML

The paradigm was applied to define a formal metamodel for UML. According to Lano, the lack of grounded interpretation for UML concepts was identified in this application. As explained by Broy and Cengarle, this application of the triune continuum paradigm:
- showed deficits of UML (e.g. circular and contradictory definitions);
- introduced an option that has an internally consistent structure supported by Russell’s theory of types;
- defined declarative semantics à la Tarski;
- was justified on the basis of philosophical and natural science foundations (in contrast to UML which is a result of tries, failures and successes that were never theoretically justified).

- SEAM

The application for RM-ODP was employed in the definition of SEAM method for Enterprise Architecture, allowing for enterprise modeling in which all the systems are systematically represented with the same modeling ontology.

- UFO

A new framework, "Unit - Function - Object" (UFO) approach, was designed for business modeling based on the ontology that was provided by the triune continuum paradigm.
