= Veryard =

Veryard is a surname. Notable people with the surname include:

- Charles Veryard (1900–1967), Australian politician, grandson of John
- John Veryard (1851–1924), Australian politician
- Richard Veryard (born 1955), British computer scientist, author, and business consultant
