= ISO/IEC 42010 =

International standard

ISO/IEC/IEEE 42010 Systems and software engineering — Architecture description is an international standard for architecture descriptions of systems and software.

== Overview ==
ISO/IEC/IEEE 42010:2022 defines requirements on the description of system, software and enterprise architectures. It aims to standardise the practice of architecture description by defining standard terms, presenting a conceptual foundation for expressing, communicating and reviewing architectures and specifying requirements that apply to architecture descriptions, architecture frameworks and architecture description languages. Following the deprecated 42010:2011 and its predecessor, IEEE 1471, the standard makes a strict distinction between architectures and architecture descriptions.

== History ==
The origin of the standard was the fast track international standardization of IEEE 1471:2000. The standard was originally balloted as ISO/IEC DIS 25961. It was subsequently adopted and published as ISO/IEC 42010:2007 which was identical with IEEE 1471:2000.

In 2006, ISO/IEC JTC1/SC7 WG 42 and IEEE Computer Society launched a coordinated revision of this standard to address: harmonization with ISO/IEC 12207 and ISO/IEC 15288; alignment with other ISO/IEC architecture standards (e.g. ISO/IEC 10746 Reference Model Open Distributed Processing); the specification of architecture frameworks and architecture description languages; architecture decision capture; and correspondences for model and view consistency.

In July 2011, the Final Draft International Standard was balloted and approved (21-0) by ISO member bodies. The corresponding IEEE version, P42010/D9, was approved as a revised standard by the IEEE-SA Standards Board on 31 October 2011. ISO/IEC/IEEE 42010:2011 was published by ISO on 24 November 2011.

In November 2022 the new edition ISO/IEC/IEEE 42010:2022 was released.
