= Enterprise architecture artifacts =

Enterprise architecture artifacts, or EA artifacts, are separate documents constituting enterprise architecture. EA artifacts provide descriptions of an organization from different perspectives important for the various actors involved in strategic decision-making and implementation of IT systems. They can be considered as key elements and cornerstones of an EA practice. Essentially, an EA practice revolves around using specific sets of EA artifacts for improving communication between different actors.

== Overview ==
EA artifacts are main instruments of an EA practice enabling effective decision-making and IT planning in organizations. The systematic use of EA artifacts for collective decision-making distinguishes a disciplined approach to information systems planning from an ad hoc and ill-organized one. Different EA artifacts are used by different actors at different moments for different purposes and fulfill different roles in organizations. EA artifacts can be very diverse in their basic properties and attributes. From the perspective of their properties all EA artifacts can differ in their informational contents, general meanings and lifecycles in the context of an EA practice.

=== Meanings ===
From the perspective of their general meaning in an EA practice all EA artifacts can be separated into decisions EA artifacts and facts EA artifacts:

- Decisions EA artifacts represent made planning decisions, i.e. achieved and formalized agreements between various stakeholders regarding the desired future course of action. Decisions EA artifacts always have certain implications for the future and usually imply specific changes in an organization. Since all planning decisions regarding the future require the discussion and consensus between their stakeholders, these EA artifacts are always developed or updated collaboratively by all relevant stakeholders and represented in formats convenient for these stakeholders. Decisions EA artifacts are inherently subjective, speculative and people-specific in nature. They are based only on informed opinions of their contributors regarding the desirable future course of action and shaped primarily by the key interests of their stakeholders. Essentially, decisions EA artifacts play the primary role in an EA practice by providing the instruments for effective communication, balanced decision-making and collaborative IT planning. Their general purpose is to help make optimal planning decisions approved by all relevant stakeholders. After decisions EA artifacts are created and approved, all their stakeholders should be ready to act according to the corresponding planning decisions reflected in these EA artifacts. Since any ideas regarding the desired future always imply collective decisions, all EA artifacts describing the future state, as well as all stateless EA artifacts also having specific implications for the future, can be automatically considered as decisions EA artifacts from the perspective of their general meaning in an EA practice
- Facts EA artifacts represent documented objective facts, i.e. reflections of the actual current situation in an organization as it is. Unlike decisions EA artifacts, facts EA artifacts do not imply any planning decisions and have no implications for the future. Since objective facts are normally not discussable and do not require any real decision-making, these EA artifacts may be developed or updated solely by specific actors, but represented in formats convenient for their future users. Facts EA artifacts are based only on acknowledged “hard” data and largely independent of specific people involved in their development. Essentially, facts EA artifacts play the supporting role in an EA practice by providing the information base required for developing decisions EA artifacts. Their general purpose is to help capture and store the objective facts regarding an organization important from the perspective of IT planning. After facts EA artifacts are created, they can be used by any actors as reference materials for planning purposes. Since a mere documentation of the current situation does not imply any real decisions, all EA artifacts describing only the current state can be automatically considered as facts EA artifacts from the perspective of their general meaning in an EA practice

== See also ==
- Enterprise architecture framework
- Origins of enterprise architecture
