= Systems architecture =

Conceptual model of a system

Example of a high-level systems architecture for a computer

A system architecture is the conceptual model that defines the structure, behavior, and views of a system. An architecture description is a formal description and representation of a system, organized in a way that supports reasoning about the structures and behaviors of the system.

A system architecture can consist of system components and the sub-systems developed, that will work together to implement the overall system. There have been efforts to formalize languages to describe system architecture, collectively these are called architecture description languages (ADLs).

== Overview ==
Various organizations can define systems architecture in different ways, including:

- The fundamental organization of a system, embodied in its components, their relationships to each other and to the environment, and the principles governing its design and evolution.
- A representation of a system, including a mapping of functionality onto hardware and software components, a mapping of the software architecture onto the hardware architecture, and human interaction with these components.
- An allocated arrangement of physical elements which provides the design solution for a consumer product or life-cycle process intended to satisfy the requirements of the functional architecture and the requirements baseline.
- An architecture consists of the most important, pervasive, top-level, strategic inventions, decisions, and their associated rationales about the overall structure (i.e., essential elements and their relationships) and associated characteristics and behavior.
- A description of the design and contents of a computer system. If documented, it may include information such as a detailed inventory of current hardware, software and networking capabilities; a description of long-range plans and priorities for future purchases, and a plan for upgrading and/or replacing dated equipment and software.
- A formal description of a system, or a detailed plan of the system at component level to guide its implementation.
- The composite of the design architectures for products and their life-cycle processes.
- The structure of components, their interrelationships, and the principles and guidelines governing their design and evolution over time.

One can think of system architecture as a set of representations of an existing (or future) system. These representations initially describe a general, high-level functional organization, and are progressively refined to more detailed and concrete descriptions.

System architecture conveys the informational content of the elements consisting of a system, the relationships among those elements, and the rules governing those relationships. The architectural components and set of relationships between these components that an architecture description may consist of hardware, software, documentation, facilities, manual procedures, or roles played by organizations or people.

A system architecture primarily concentrates on the internal interfaces among the system's components or subsystems, and on the interface(s) between the system and its external environment, especially the user. (In the specific case of computer systems, this latter, special, interface is known as the computer human interface, AKA human computer interface, or HCI; formerly called the man-machine interface.)

One can contrast a system architecture with system architecture engineering (SAE) - the method and discipline for effectively implementing the architecture of a system:

- SAE is a method because a sequence of steps is prescribed to produce or to change the architecture of a system within a set of constraints.
- SAE is a discipline because a body of knowledge is used to inform practitioners as to the most effective way to design the system within a set of constraints.

== History ==
Systems architecture depends heavily on practices and techniques which were developed over thousands of years in many other fields, perhaps the most important being civil architecture.

- Prior to the advent of digital computers, the electronics and other engineering disciplines used the term "system" as it is still commonly used today. However, with the arrival of digital computers and the development of software engineering as a separate discipline, it was often necessary to distinguish among engineered hardware artifacts, software artifacts, and the combined artifacts. A programmable hardware artifact, or computing machine, that lacks its computer program is impotent; even as a software artifact, or program, is equally impotent unless it can be used to alter the sequential states of a suitable (hardware) machine. However, a hardware machine and its programming can be designed to perform an almost illimitable number of abstract and physical tasks. Within the computer and software engineering disciplines (and, often, other engineering disciplines, such as communications), then, the term system came to be defined as containing all of the elements necessary (which generally includes both hardware and software) to perform a useful function.
- Consequently, within these engineering disciplines, a system generally refers to a programmable hardware machine and its included program. And a systems engineer is defined as one concerned with the complete device, both hardware and software and, more particularly, all of the interfaces of the device, including that between hardware and software, and especially between the complete device and its user (the CHI). The hardware engineer deals (more or less) exclusively with the hardware device; the software engineer deals (more or less) exclusively with the computer program; and the systems engineer is responsible for seeing that the program is capable of properly running within the hardware device, and that the system composed of the two entities is capable of properly interacting with its external environment, especially the user, and performing its intended function.
- A systems architecture makes use of elements of both software and hardware and is used to enable the design of such a composite system. A good architecture may be viewed as a 'partitioning scheme,' or algorithm, which partitions all of the system's present and foreseeable requirements into a workable set of cleanly bounded subsystems with nothing left over. That is, it is a partitioning scheme which is exclusive, inclusive, and exhaustive. A major purpose of the partitioning is to arrange the elements in the sub systems so that there is a minimum of interdependencies needed among them. In both software and hardware, a good sub system tends to be seen to be a meaningful "object". Moreover, a good architecture provides for an easy mapping to the user's requirements and the validation tests of the user's requirements. Ideally, a mapping also exists from every least element to every requirement and test.

== Modern trends in systems architecture ==
With the increasing complexity of digital systems, modern systems architecture has evolved to incorporate advanced principles such as modularization, microservices, and artificial intelligence-driven optimizations. Cloud computing, edge computing, and distributed ledger technologies (DLTs) have also influenced architectural decisions, enabling more scalable, secure, and fault-tolerant designs.

One of the most significant shifts in recent years has been the adoption of Software-Defined Architectures (SDA), which decouple hardware from software, allowing systems to be more flexible and adaptable to changing requirements. This trend is particularly evident in network architectures, where Software-Defined Networking (SDN) and Network Function Virtualization (NFV) enable more dynamic management of network resources.

In addition, AI-enhanced system architectures have gained traction, leveraging machine learning for predictive maintenance, anomaly detection, and automated system optimization. The rise of cyber-physical systems (CPS) and digital twins has further extended system architecture principles beyond traditional computing, integrating real-world data into virtual models for better decision-making.

With the rise of edge computing, system architectures now focus on decentralization and real-time processing, reducing dependency on centralized data centers and improving latency-sensitive applications such as autonomous vehicles, robotics, and IoT networks.

These advancements continue to redefine how systems are designed, leading to more resilient, scalable, and intelligent architectures suited for the digital age.

== Types ==
Several types of system architectures exist, each catering to different domains and applications. While all system architectures share fundamental principles of structure, behavior, and interaction, they vary in design based on their intended purpose. Several types of systems architectures (underlain by the same fundamental principles) have been identified as follows:

- Hardware Architecture: Hardware architecture defines the physical components of a system, including processors, memory hierarchies, buses, and input/output interfaces. It encompasses the design and integration of computing hardware elements to ensure performance, reliability, and scalability.
- Software Architecture: Software architecture focuses on the high-level organization of software systems, including modules, components, and communication patterns. It plays a crucial role in defining system behavior, security, and maintainability. Examples include monolithic, microservices, event-driven, and layered architectures.
- Enterprise Architecture: Enterprise architecture provides a strategic blueprint for an organization’s IT infrastructure, ensuring that business goals align with technology investments. It includes frameworks such as TOGAF (The Open Group Architecture Framework) and Zachman Framework to standardize IT governance and business operations.
- Collaborative Systems Architecture: This category includes large-scale interconnected systems designed for seamless interaction among multiple entities. Examples include the Internet, intelligent transportation systems, air traffic control networks, and defense systems. These architectures emphasize interoperability, distributed control, and resilience.
- Manufacturing Systems Architecture: Manufacturing system architectures integrate automation, robotics, IoT, and AI-driven decision-making to optimize production workflows. Emerging trends include Industry 4.0, cyber-physical systems (CPS), and digital twins, enabling predictive maintenance and real-time monitoring.
- Cloud and Edge Computing Architecture: With the shift toward cloud-based infrastructures, cloud architecture defines how resources are distributed across data centers and virtualized environments. Edge computing architecture extends this by processing data closer to the source, reducing latency for applications like autonomous vehicles, industrial automation, and smart cities.
- AI-Driven System Architecture: Artificial intelligence (AI) and machine learning-driven architectures optimize decision-making by dynamically adapting system behavior based on real-time data. This is widely used in autonomous systems, cybersecurity, and intelligent automation.

== See also ==
- Arcadia (engineering)
- Architectural pattern (computer science)
- Department of Defense Architecture Framework
- Enterprise architecture framework
- Enterprise information security architecture
- Process architecture
- Requirements analysis
- Software architecture
- Software engineering
- Systems architect
- Systems analysis
- Systems design
- Systems engineering
