= Information technology architecture =

Information technology (IT) architecture is the process of development of methodical information technology specifications, models and guidelines, using a variety of information technology notations, for example Unified Modeling Language (UML), within a coherent information technology architecture framework, following formal and informal information technology solution, enterprise, and infrastructure architecture processes. These processes have been developed in the past few decades in response to the requirement for a coherent, consistent approach to delivery of information technology capabilities. They have been developed by information technology product vendors and independent consultancies, such as for example the Open Group, based on real experiences in the information technology marketplace and collaboration amongst industry stakeholders. Best practice information technology architecture encourages the use of open technology standards and global technology interoperability. Information technology architecture can also be called a high-level map or plan of the information assets in an organization, including the physical design of the building that holds the hardware.

Grady Booch, Ivar Jacobson, and James Rumbaugh are accredited with developing the first Unified Modeling Language (UML), a widely used technology modeling language.

IBM was an early developer of formal solution and infrastructure architecture methodologies for information technology.
