= TOGAF =

Reference model for enterprise architecture

- The Open Group Architecture Framework
- Status: Active
- First published: 1995
- Domain: Enterprise architecture
- Website: www.opengroup.org/togaf

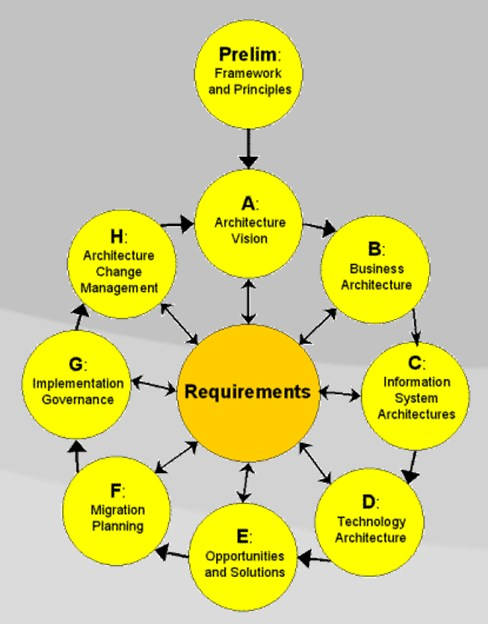
Structure of the TOGAF Architecture Development Method (ADM).

The Open Group Architecture Framework (TOGAF) is an enterprise architecture framework. It provides an approach for designing, planning, implementing, and governing an enterprise information technology architecture. TOGAF is a high-level approach to design. It is typically modeled at four levels: Business, Application, Data, and Technology. It relies heavily on modularization, standardization, and already existing, proven technologies and product.

TOGAF began to be developed in 1995 by The Open Group, based on the United States Department of Defense's TAFIM and Capgemini's Integrated Architecture Framework (IAF). As of 2016, The Open Group claims that TOGAF is employed by 80% of Global 50 companies and 60% of Fortune 500 companies.

An architecture framework is a set of tools that can be used for developing a broad range of different architectures. It will typically:

- describe a method for defining an information system in terms of a set of building blocks
- show how the building blocks fit together
- contain a set of tools
- provide a common vocabulary
- include a list of recommended standards
- include a list of compliant products that can be used to implement the building blocks.

The ANSI/IEEE Standard 1471-2000 specification of architecture (of software-intensive systems) may be stated as: "the fundamental organization of a system, embodied in its components, their relationships to each other and the environment, and the principles governing its design and evolution".

However TOGAF has its own view, which may be specified as either a "formal description of a system, or a detailed plan of the system at component level to guide its implementation", or as "the structure of components, their interrelationships, and the principles and guidelines governing their design and evolution over time".

The Architecture Development Method (ADM) is the core of TOGAF which describes a method for developing and managing the life-cycle of enterprise architecture.

== History ==
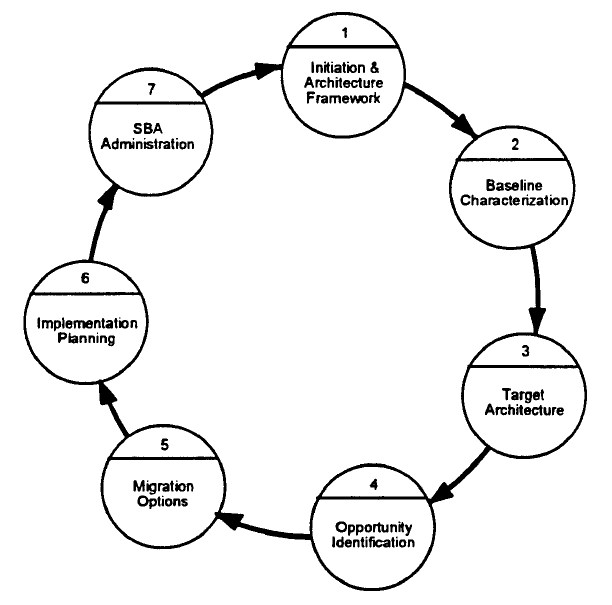
DoD Standards-Based Architecture Planning Process in TAFIM.

TOGAF was initiated in the early 1990s as methodology for the development of technical architecture, and has been developed by The Open Group into an extensive enterprise architecture framework. In 1995, the first version of TOGAF (TOGAF 1.0) was presented. This version was mainly based on the Technical Architecture Framework for Information Management (TAFIM), development started in the late 1980s by the US Department of Defense.

In December 2001 TOGAF 7, the "Technical Edition", was published. TOGAF 8 ("Enterprise Edition") was first published in December 2002 and republished in updated form as TOGAF 8.1 in December 2003. Around 2005 TOGAF became a registered trademark of The Open Group. In November 2006 the Open Group released TOGAF 8.1.1. According to The Open Group, as of February 2011, over 15,000 individuals are TOGAF Certified. As of April 2018 the official register has over 77,500 certifications.

An evolutionary development from TOGAF 8, TOGAF 9 includes many new features such as:

- Increased rigor, including a formal Content Metamodel that links the artifacts of TOGAF together (although there are some problems with the Metamodel)
- Architecture repository and the Enterprise Continuum
- Elimination of unnecessary differences, and many more examples and templates

Additional guidelines and techniques include:

- A formal business-driven approach to architecture
- Business capability-based planning
- Guidance on how to use TOGAF to develop security architectures and SOA

The latest version is TOGAF 10, launched on 25 April 2022.

The Open Group provides TOGAF free of charge to organizations for their own internal noncommercial purposes.

== TOGAF pillars ==
=== Enterprise architecture domains ===
TOGAF is based on four interrelated areas of specialization called architecture domains:

- Business architecture which defines the business strategy, governance, organization, and key business processes of the organization
- Data architecture which describes the structure of an organization's logical and physical data assets and the associated data management resources
- Applications architecture which provides a blueprint for the individual systems to be deployed, the interactions between the application systems, and their relationships to the core business processes of the organization with the frameworks for services to be exposed as business functions for integration
- Technical architecture, or technology architecture, which describes the hardware, software, and network infrastructure needed to support the deployment of core, mission-critical applications

=== Architecture Development Method ===
The Architecture Development Method (ADM) is applied to develop an enterprise architecture which will meet the business and information technology needs of an organization. It may be tailored to the organization's needs and is then employed to manage the execution of architecture planning activities.

The process is iterative and cyclic. Each step checks with Requirements. Phase C involves some combination of both Data Architecture and Applications Architecture. Additional clarity can be added between steps B and C in order to provide a complete information architecture.

Performance engineering working practices are applied to the Requirements phase, and to the Business Architecture, Information System Architecture, and Technology architecture phases. Within Information System Architecture, it is applied to both the Data Architecture and Application Architecture.

=== Enterprise Continuum ===
The Enterprise Continuum is a way of classifying solutions and architectures on a continuum that range from generic foundation architectures through to tailored organization-specific both within and outside the Architecture Repository. These include architectural models, architectural patterns, architecture descriptions, and other artifacts. These artifacts may exist within the enterprise and also in the IT industry at large.

The Enterprise Continuum consists of both the Architecture Continuum and the Solutions Continuum. The Architecture Continuum specifies the structuring of reusable architecture assets and includes rules, representations, and relationships of the information systems available to the enterprise. The Solutions Continuum describes the implementation of the Architecture Continuum by defining reusable Solution Building Blocks (SBBs).

== TOGAF Certification ==
TOGAF provides certifications for tools and people.

=== TOGAF certified tools ===
Certified TOGAF 9 tools are listed in the following table, and are generally registered with The Open Group.

Product Name	Company	First Certified	Renewal	TOGAF Version
ABACUS 6.0	Avolution	23-May-2012	23-May-2028	9.2
Bizzdesign Enterprise Studio	Bizzdesign	18-Jul-2012	18-Jul-2026	9.2
Bizzdesign Hopex	Bizzdesign	18-Jul-2012	18-Jul-2026	9.2
Bizzdesign Alfabet	Bizzdesign	22-Jun-2012	22-Jun-2026	9.2
Bizzdesign Horizzon	Bizzdesign	18-Jul-2012	18-Jul-2026	9.2
ADOIT	BOC Group	14-Sep-2017	14-Sep-2027	9.1
iServer Business and IT Transformation Suite 2015	Orbus Software	19-Aug-2013	19-Aug-2027	9.2
ARIS 9.0	Software AG	19-Nov-2013	19-Nov-2027	9.1
