= Enterprise architecture =

Business function methodology

Enterprise architecture (EA) is a business function concerned with the structures and behaviours of a business, especially business roles and processes that create and use business data. The international definition according to the Federation of Enterprise Architecture Professional Organizations is "a well-defined practice for conducting enterprise analysis, design, planning, and implementation, using a comprehensive approach at all times, for the successful development and execution of strategy. Enterprise architecture applies architecture principles and practices to guide organizations through the business, information, process, and technology changes necessary to execute their strategies. These practices utilize the various aspects of an enterprise to identify, motivate, and achieve these changes."

The United States Federal Government is an example of an organization that practices EA, in this case with its Capital Planning and Investment Control processes. Companies such as Independence Blue Cross, Intel, Volkswagen AG, and InterContinental Hotels Group also use EA to improve their business architectures as well as to improve business performance and productivity. Additionally, the Federal Enterprise Architecture's reference guide aids federal agencies in the development of their architectures.

== Introduction ==
As a discipline, EA "proactively and holistically lead[s] enterprise responses to disruptive forces by identifying and analyzing the execution of change" towards organizational goals. EA gives business and IT leaders recommendations for policy adjustments and provides best strategies to support and enable business development and change within the information systems the business depends on. EA provides a guide for decision making towards these objectives. The National Computing Centre's EA best practice guidance states that an EA typically "takes the form of a comprehensive set of cohesive models that describe the structure and functions of an enterprise. The individual models in an EA are arranged in a logical manner that provides an ever-increasing level of detail about the enterprise."

Important players within EA include enterprise architects and solutions architects. Enterprise architects are at the top level of the architect hierarchy, meaning they have more responsibilities than solutions architects. While solutions architects focus on their own relevant solutions, enterprise architects focus on solutions for and the impact on the whole organization. Enterprise architects oversee many solution architects and business functions. As practitioners of EA, enterprise architects support an organization's strategic vision by acting to align people, process, and technology decisions with actionable goals and objectives that result in quantifiable improvements toward achieving that vision. The practice of EA "analyzes areas of common activity within or between organizations, where information and other resources are exchanged to guide future states from an integrated viewpoint of strategy, business, and technology."

=== Definitions ===
The term enterprise can be defined as an organizational unit, organization, or collection of organizations that share a set of common goals and collaborate to provide specific products or services to customers. In that sense, the term enterprise covers various types of organizations, regardless of their size, ownership model, operational model, or geographical distribution. It includes those organizations' complete sociotechnical system, including people, information, processes, and technologies. Enterprise as a sociotechnical system defines the scope of EA.

The term architecture refers to fundamental concepts or properties of a system in its environment; and embodied in its elements, relationships, and in the principles of its design and evolution. A methodology for developing and using architecture to guide the transformation of a business from a baseline state to a target state, sometimes through several transition states, is usually known as an enterprise architecture framework. A framework provides a structured collection of processes, techniques, artifact descriptions, reference models, and guidance for the production and use of an enterprise-specific architecture description. Open-source tools supporting EA practice, such as the Essential Project, have also been evaluated for suitability in academic and commercial training contexts.

Paramount to changing the EA is the identification of a sponsor. Their mission, vision, strategy, and the governance framework define all roles, responsibilities, and relationships involved in the anticipated transformation. Changes considered by enterprise architects typically include innovations in the structure or processes of an organization; innovations in the use of information systems or technologies; the integration and/or standardization of business processes; and improvement of the quality and timeliness of business information.

According to the standard ISO/IEC/IEEE 42010, the product used to describe the architecture of a system is called an architectural description. In practice, an architectural description contains a variety of lists, tables, and diagrams. These are models known as views. In the case of EA, these models describe the logical business functions or capabilities, business processes, human roles and actors, the physical organization structure, data flows and data stores, business applications and platform applications, hardware, and communications infrastructure.

The first use of the term "enterprise architecture" is often incorrectly attributed to John Zachman's 1987 A framework for information systems architecture. The first publication to use it was instead a National Institute of Standards (NIST) Special Publication on the challenges of information system integration. The NIST article describes EA as consisting of several levels. Business unit architecture is the top level and might be a total corporate entity or a sub-unit. It establishes for the whole organization necessary frameworks for "satisfying both internal information needs" as well as the needs of external entities, which include cooperating organizations, customers, and federal agencies. The lower levels of the EA that provide information to higher levels are more attentive to detail on behalf of their superiors. In addition to this structure, business unit architecture establishes standards, policies, and procedures that either enhance or stymie the organization's mission.

The main difference between these two definitions is that Zachman's concept was the creation of individual information systems optimized for business, while NIST's described the management of all information systems within a business unit. The definitions in both publications, however, agreed that due to the "increasing size and complexity of the [i]mplementations of [i]nformation systems... logical construct[s] (or architecture) for defining and controlling the interfaces and... [i]ntegration of all the components of a system" is necessary. Zachman in particular urged for a "strategic planning methodology."

== Overview ==
=== Schools of thought ===
Within the field of enterprise architecture, there are three overarching schools: Enterprise IT Design, Enterprise Integrating, and Enterprise Ecosystem Adaption. Which school one subscribes to will impact how they see the EA's purpose and scope, as well as the means of achieving it, the skills needed to conduct it, and the locus of responsibility for conducting it.

Under Enterprise IT Design, the main purpose of EA is to guide the process of planning and designing an enterprise's IT/IS capabilities to meet the desired organizational objectives, often by greater alignment between IT/IS and business concerns. Architecture proposals and decisions are limited to the IT/IS aspects of the enterprise and other aspects service only as inputs. The Enterprise Integrating school believes that the purpose of EA is to create a greater coherency between the various concerns of an enterprise (HR, IT, Operations, etc.), including the link between strategy formulation and execution. Architecture proposals and decisions here encompass all aspects of the enterprise. The Enterprise Ecosystem Adaption school states that the purpose of EA is to foster and maintain the learning capabilities of enterprises so they may be sustainable. Consequently, a great deal of emphasis is put on improving the capabilities of the enterprise to improve itself, to innovate, and to coevolve with its environment. Typically, proposals and decisions encompass both the enterprise and its environment.

=== Benefits, challenges, and criticisms ===
The benefits of EA are achieved through its direct and indirect contributions to organizational goals. Notable benefits include support in the areas related to design and re-design of the organizational structures during mergers, acquisitions, or general organizational change; enforcement of discipline and business process standardization, and enablement of process consolidation, reuse, and integration; support for investment decision-making and work prioritization; enhancement of collaboration and communication between project stakeholders and contribution to efficient project scoping and to defining more complete and consistent project deliverabless; and an increase in the timeliness of requirements elicitation and the accuracy of requirement definitions through publishing of the EA documentation.

Other benefits include contribution to optimal system designs and efficient resource allocation during system development and testing; enforcement of discipline and standardization of IT planning activities and contribution to a reduction in time for technology-related decision making; reduction of the system's implementation and operational costs, and minimization of replicate infrastructure services across business units; reduction in IT complexity, consolidation of data and applications, and improvement of interoperability of the systems; more open and responsive IT as reflected through increased accessibility of data for regulatory compliance, and increased transparency of infrastructure changes; and a reduction of business risks from system failures and security breaches. EA also helps reduce risks of project delivery. Establishing EA as an accepted, recognized, functionally integrated and fully involved concept at operational and tactical levels is one of the biggest challenges facing Enterprise Architects today and one of the main reasons why many EA initiatives fail.

A key concern about EA has been the difficulty in arriving at metrics of success because of the broad-brush and often opaque nature of EA projects. Additionally, there have been a number of reports, including those written by Ivar Jacobson, Gartner, Erasmus University Rotterdam and IDS Scheer, Dion Hinchcliffe, and Stanley Gaver, that argue that the frequent failure of EA initiatives makes the concept not worth the effort and that the methodology will fade out quickly.

== Relationship to other disciplines ==
According to the Federation of Enterprise Architecture Professional Organizations (FEAPO), EA interacts with a wide array of other disciplines commonly found in business settings such as performance engineering and management, process engineering and management, IT and enterprise portfolio management, governance and compliance, IT strategic planning, risk analysis, information management, metadata management, organization development, design thinking, systems thinking, and user experience design. The EA of an organization is too complex and extensive to document in its entirety, so knowledge management techniques provide a way to explore and analyze these hidden, tacit, or implicit areas. In return, EA provides a way of documenting the components of an organization and their interaction in a systemic and holistic way that complements knowledge management.

In various venues, EA has been discussed as having a relationship with Service Oriented Architecture (SOA), a particular style of application integration. Research points to EA promoting the use of SOA as an enterprise-wide integration pattern. The broad reach of EA has resulted in this business role being included in the information technology governance processes of many organizations. Analyst firm Real Story Group suggested that EA and the emerging concept of the digital workplace are "two sides to the same coin." The Cutter Consortium described EA as an information and knowledge-based discipline.

== See also ==
- Enterprise architecture artifacts
- Enterprise architecture framework
- Architectural pattern (computer science)
- Architecture of Integrated Information Systems
- Architecture of Interoperable Information Systems
- Architecture domain
- John Zachman, promoter of enterprise architecture
- Enterprise Architecture Service Life Cycle - SOMF
