= Architecture framework =

Framework for describing architecture within a particular domain

The ISO/IEC/IEEE 42010 Conceptual Model of Architecture Description defines the term architecture framework within systems engineering and software development as:

"An architecture framework establishes a common practice for creating, interpreting, analyzing and using architecture descriptions within a particular domain of application or stakeholder community. Examples of Architecture Frameworks: MODAF, TOGAF, Kruchten's 4+1 view model, RM-ODP."

Especially the domain within a company or other organization is covered by enterprise architecture frameworks.

The Survey of Architecture Frameworks lists some of the available architecture frameworks.
