= List of research centres and institutes of the Royal Melbourne Institute of Technology =

This is a list of research centres and institutes of the Royal Melbourne Institute of Technology (RMIT) located at the campuses of its Australian (RMIT University) and Vietnamese (RMIT University Vietnam) branches, its European centre and partner sites.

== Centres, institutes and laboratories ==
- Australian Asia-Pacific Economic Cooperation (APEC) Study Centre
  - Melbourne APEC Finance Centre
- Australian Centre for Human Rights Education (ACHRE)
- Australian Film Institute (AFI) Research Collection
- European Union (EU) Centre at RMIT
- International Centre for Environmental and Bioethics
- International Centre for Graphic Technology
- Nautilus at RMIT
- RMIT Advanced Manufacturing Precinct
- RMIT Applied and Nutritional Toxicology Key Centre
- RMIT Biosignals Laboratory
- RMIT Blockchain Innovation Hub
- RMIT Centre for Additive Manufacturing
- RMIT Centre for Advanced Electronics and Sensors
- RMIT Centre for Advanced Materials and Industrial Chemistry (CAMIC)
- RMIT Centre for Advanced Materials and Performance Textiles (CAMPT)
- RMIT Centre for Animation and Interactive Media
- RMIT Centre for Applied Social Research (CASR)
- RMIT Centre for Art, Society and Transformation (CAST)
- RMIT Centre for Communication, Politics and Culture
- RMIT Centre for Construction Work Health and Safety Research
- RMIT Centre for Design Practice Research (d_Lab)
  - Ethical Design Laboratory
- RMIT Centre for Game Design Research
  - Virtual Experiences Laboratory (VXLab)
- RMIT Centre for Global Research
- RMIT Centre for Education, Training and Work in the Asian Century
- RMIT Centre for Environmental Sustainability and Remediation (EnSuRe)
- RMIT Centre for Innovative Justice
- RMIT Centre for Innovative Structures and Materials
- RMIT Centre for Integrated Project Solutions
- RMIT Centre for Molecular and Nanoscale Physics (nanoPHYS)
- RMIT Centre for Risk and Community Safety
- RMIT Centre for People, Organisations and Work
- RMIT Centre for Urban Research
- RMIT Computational Fluid Dynamics Laboratory
- RMIT Communication Technologies Research Centre
- RMIT Design Archives
- RMIT Digital Ethnography Research Centre (DERC)
- RMIT Food Research and Innovation Centre
- RMIT Games and Experimental Entertainment Laboratory (GEElab)
  - Exertion Games Laboratory
- RMIT Green Engines Research Facility
- RMIT Microelectronics and Materials Technology Centre
- RMIT Micro/Nanomedical Research Centre
  - Micro/Nano Research Facility
- RMIT Microscopy and Microanalysis Facility
- RMIT Nuclear Magnetic Resonance Spectroscopy Facility
- RMIT Platform Technologies Research Institute
- RMIT Rheology and Materials Processing Centre
  - Rheology and Materials Characterisation Laboratory
- RMIT Satellite Positioning for Atmosphere, Climate and Environment (SPACE) Research Centre
- RMIT Separation Science and Mass Spectrometry Facility
- RMIT Spatial Information Architecture Laboratory (SIAL)
  - SIAL Sound Studios
- RMIT Science, Health and Engineering Educational Research (SHEER) Centre
- RMIT Textile Design Specialist Centre
- RMIT Vibrational Spectroscopy Facility
- RMIT Vietnam Centre for Commerce and Management
- RMIT Vietnam Centre for Communication and Design
- RMIT Vietnam Centre for Technology
- RMIT Virtual Reality Centre
- RMIT Water: Effective Technologies and Tools (WETT) Research Centre
- Sir Lawrence Wackett Aerospace Centre
- Victorian X-Ray Structural Determination and Materials Characterisation Facility

== Co-operative research partnerships ==
- Australian Research Council (ARC) Centre of Excellence for Creative Industries and Innovation
  - ARC Centre for Complex Systems (ACCS), 2004–2009
  - ARC Centre of Australian Biodiversity and Heritage (CABAH), 2017–
  - ARC Centre of Excellence for All-Sky Astrophysics (CAASTRO), 2011–2018
  - ARC Centre of Excellence for Creative Industries and Innovation (CCI), 2005–2013
  - ARC Centre of Excellence for Environmental Decisions (CEED)
  - ARC Centre of Excellence for the History of Emotions (CHE), 2011–
  - ARC Centre of Excellence for Nanoscale BioPhotonics
  - ARC Centre of Excellence for Ultrahigh-bandwidth Devices for Optical Systems (CUDOS)
  - ARC Centre of Excellence in Population Ageing Research (CEPAR), 2011–
  - ARC Centre of Excellence in Future Low-Energy Electronics Technologies (FLEET), 2017–
- Australian Centre for Electromagnetic Bioeffects Research
- Australian Centre for Financial Studies
- Australian Defence Materials Technology Centre
- Australian Housing and Urban Research Institute (AHURI)
- Australia-India Research Centre for Automation Software Engineering (AICAUSE)
- China-Australia International Research Centre for Chinese Medicines (CAIRCCM)
- Confucius Institute for Chinese Medicines
- Cooperative Research Centre (CRC) for Advanced Automotive Technology
- CRC for Advanced Composite Structures
- CRC for Advanced Manufacturing
- CRC for Bushfire and Natural Hazards
- CRC for Cast Metals Manufacturing
- CRC for Energy Pipelines
- CRC for Smart Services
- CRC for Space Environment Management
- CRC for Spatial Information
- CRC for Wound Management Innovation
- European Union (EU) Pattern Analysis, Statistical Modelling and Computational Learning (PASCAL) International Observatory
- Indian Institute of Chemical Technology (IICT)-RMIT Research Centre
- Victorian Centre for Climate Change Adaptation Research
- World Health Organization (WHO) Collaborating Centre for Traditional Medicine
