= AADL =

AADL may refer to:

- Ann Arbor District Library
- Architecture Analysis & Design Language
