= HPMS =

HPMS may refer to:

- Harbour Pointe Middle School, in Mukilteo, Washington, United States
- Harrold Priory Middle School, in Bedfordshire, England
- High proper motion star
- Highway Performance Monitoring System, an annual report sent by each U.S. state's DOT to the FHWA

== See also ==
- HPM (disambiguation)
