= HPM =

HPM may refer to:

- Harbarian process modeling
- Hargeisa Provincial Museum, in Hargeisa, Somalia
- Haystack Prayer Meeting, held in Williamstown, Massachusetts, in 1806
- High-power microwave, directed-energy weapon using electromagnetic radiation
- high performance mobile, a semiconductor production type parametric variant of TSMC
- Hospice and Palliative Medicine, a medical specialty that focuses on symptom management, relief of suffering and end-of-life care
- Human performance modeling
- Human Potential Movement, self-improvement movement of the 1960s
- Hydrogen-moderated self-regulating nuclear power module, a type of nuclear power generator
- A high proper motion star
- High performance material, type of special technical plastic
- High Performance Process Manager - type of Honeywell-produced device widely used in industry to control chemical and refining processes
- Honda Prospect Motor, an automobile manufacturing company
- HPM (originally Herman Plastic Moulding), Australian manufacturer of electrical equipment; owned by Legrand
