= ARC Centre for Complex Systems =

ACCS Logo

The ARC Centre for Complex Systems (ACCS) was established in 2004 from a consortium of Australian universities, led by the University of Queensland. The objective of ACCS was to conduct basic and applied research in the field of complex systems. It conducted research into both the science and engineering of complex systems. Funding was provided by the Australian Research Council (ARC) and the universities involved. The ACCS was funded under the ARC's Centre of Excellence Scheme until mid-2009, after which industry collaborations and further funding was established to continue to apply the Centre's research.

== Background and description ==
Complex systems science is an emerging discipline developing new ways of investigating large, highly intricate, dynamically changing systems across diverse areas such as biology, social networks and socio-technological systems, economics and the environment. The ACCS was established to conduct world-class research on questions fundamental to understanding, designing and managing complex systems.

While complex systems research is considered basic research, with commercialisation still some time off, complex computing holds answers to real-life systems.

The ACCS provided a focus for complex systems science research in Australia, and developed strong infrastructure for modelling and analysing network-based systems, enabling the science to be applied to real-world problems.

The Centre had its headquarters at The University of Queensland in Brisbane, with nodes at Griffith University in Brisbane, Monash University in Melbourne, and The University of New South Wales campus at the Australian Defence Force Academy in Canberra.

International partners were the French Centre National de la Research Scientifique and the Indian Institute of Technology, and investigators from Boeing, CSIRO, the Santa Fe Institute and other Australian and international organisations collaborated on the program.

The ACCS's research programs emphasised cross-disciplinary research, involving leading researchers from a range of disciplines including: systems and software engineering, economics, visualisation, human factors, computational mathematics and statistics, and relevant application domains including aerospace, economics, energy and biology.

== Research program ==
The goal of the ACCS's research was to develop deeper understanding of fundamental phenomena in complex systems, such as how macro-level system properties and behaviours emerge from relatively simple micro-level interactions, what mechanisms enable complex systems to self-organise, and how complex systems can be managed and controlled.

The Centre's core research program was based around a number of application areas.

=== Genetic regulatory networks ===
Research in this program tackled fundamental questions about growth and form in cellular biology. Computational modelling was used to study how the control of development results from an interaction between each cell's genetic regulatory network and its inputs from neighbouring cells and its environment, and how the process proceeds reliably, while coping with unreliable components, perturbation, injury, and changing environments.

=== Air traffic control ===
This program applied complex systems science to the problem of improving the efficiency of air travel without compromising safety. To do this, researchers developed and used air traffic simulators to study new concepts and tools for air traffic management, and developed new approaches to assurance of system-level properties including safety and efficiency

=== Evolutionary economic systems ===
In this program, complex systems and network theory was applied to economics and business to understand how evolutionary change occurs. Multi-agent modelling and associated simulation and calibration techniques were core components of the methodology used. We investigated new ways of testing for complex patterns in high frequency data, by studying trade-by trade data in stock markets and in electricity markets and seeking 'pattern matches' in artificially generated agent-based modelling data. We investigated new ways of dealing with spatial complexity in several contexts. Also visualisation techniques, rarely used in economics, were applied in a range of data-rich contexts to better understand the architecture and complex dynamics of systems.

=== Electricity networks and energy markets ===
This program investigated ways of integrating technical and market aspects of power systems with price dynamics to provide key insights into planning expansion of Australia's power transmission network. It also aimed to apply modern computational modelling techniques to the interface between the physical properties of the electricity system and its economic considerations. A particular focus was placed on the impacts of the transmission network and power station operation on electricity price behaviour and its influence on infrastructure investment decisions. It also looked into the importance of customer-load impact on system and market operations.

=== Dependable computer-based systems ===
This program was concerned with the development of modelling and analysis tools to ensure that dependability is designed into complex computer-based systems, particularly in areas such as transport, health and finance. There is a constant need for new methods and tools to enable engineers to ensure that such systems meet society's demands for dependability, safety and reliability. One of the tools, Behavior Trees, was successfully trialled by Raytheon Australia to analyse six large defence projects.

=== Complex systems theory and applications ===
In addition to the research programs described above, the ACCS included a number of projects addressing key problems for complex systems. The projects were concerned with the application of theory to solve issues in the design and operation of complex socio-technological systems, and with the development of new analysis techniques for complex systems.

== See also ==
- Behavior Trees
- Complexity economics
- Air traffic control
- Genetic regulatory network
