= Darwin (ADL) =

Darwin is an architecture description language (ADL), which has existed in various forms since 1991, with its language reference manual last revised in 1997 by the Imperial College of Science, Technology and Medicine in London. It can be used in a software engineering context to describe the organisation of a piece of software in terms of components, their interfaces and the bindings between components. Darwin was intended for distributed programs to be specified as a hierarchic construction of components, but the general concept of representing functional aspects of programs as components can be generalized, and has subsequently been given operational semantics via π-calculus. Although Darwin allows showing the topology between components, there is not an explicit ability to differentiate types of connectors other than with components.
