= Formalized administrative notation =

Formalized administrative notation (FAN) is a method that enables administrators of various organizations to describe the flow and sequence of operations, identify their responsibilities, define and integrate their transactions etc. Its objective is to formulate the mode of implementing a specific system in order to have further systemization. Originally called in Spanish as MECAF (Metodo de expresion de circuitos administrativos formalizado)

== Known areas ==
FAN is primarily used by professionals in systems operations in order to achieve formalized descriptions of administrative circuits.

== Types of action ==
FAN is generally used to implement software packets for enterprise resource planning (ERP), customer relationship management (CRM) and supply chain.

== History ==
In Argentina, FAN was created by Pablo Iacub y Leonardo Mayo and was originally used in the '90s for multiple software implementation projects within the country. FAN was first formally recognized in 2005 at the IRMA congress in the U.S. In 2014, it was presented at FELTI and received the LatinaTEC award. Currently, FAN is used in various universities throughout Latin America to enable students to understand and describe the mechanics of administrative circuits of different types of organizations.
