= Architecture description language =

Standardized language on architecture description

Architecture description languages (ADLs) are used in several disciplines: system engineering, software engineering, and enterprise modelling and engineering.

The system engineering community uses an architecture description language as a language and/or a conceptual model to describe and represent system architectures.

The software engineering community uses an architecture description language as a computer language to create a description of a software architecture. In the case of a so-called technical architecture, the architecture must be communicated to software developers; a functional architecture is communicated to various stakeholders and users. Some ADLs that have been developed are: Acme (developed by CMU), AADL (standardized by the SAE), C2 (developed by UCI), SBC-ADL (developed by National Sun Yat-Sen University), Darwin (developed by Imperial College London), and Wright (developed by CMU).

== Overview ==
The ISO/IEC/IEEE 42010 document, Systems and software engineering—Architecture description, defines an architecture description language as "any form of expression for use in architecture descriptions" and specifies minimum requirements on ADLs.

The enterprise modelling and engineering community have also developed architecture description languages catered for at the enterprise level. Examples include ArchiMate (now a standard of The Open Group), DEMO, ABACUS (developed by the University of Technology, Sydney). These languages do not necessarily refer to software components, etc. Most of them, however, refer to an application architecture as the architecture that is communicated to the software engineers.

Most of the writing below refers primarily to the perspective of the software engineering community.

A standard notation (ADL) for representing architectures helps promote mutual communication, the embodiment of early design decisions, and the creation of a transferable abstraction of a system. Architectures in the past were largely represented by box-and-line drawing annotated with such things as the nature of the component, properties, semantics of connections, and overall system behavior. ADLs result from a linguistic approach to the formal representation of architectures, and as such they address its shortcomings. Also important, sophisticated ADLs allow for early analysis and feasibility testing of architectural design decisions.

== History ==
ADLs have been classified into three broad categories: box-and-line informal drawings, formal architecture description language, and UML (unified modeling language)-based notations.

Box-and-line have been for a long time the most predominant means for describing software architectures. While providing useful documentation, the level of informality limited the usefulness of the architecture description. A more rigorous way for describing software architectures was required. Quoting Allen and Garlan (1997), "while these [box-and-line] descriptions may provide useful documentation, the current level of informality limits their usefulness. Since it is generally imprecise what is meant by such architectural descriptions, it may be impossible to analyze an architecture for consistency or determine non-trivial properties of it. Moreover, there is no way to check that a system implementation is faithful to its architectural design." A similar conclusion is drawn in Perry and Wolf (1992), which reports that: "Aside from providing clear and precise documentation, the primary purpose of specifications is to provide automated analysis of the documents and to expose various kinds of problems that would otherwise go undetected."

Since then, a thread of research on formal languages for software architecture description has been carried out. Tens of formal ADLs have been proposed, each characterized by different conceptual architectural elements, different syntax or semantics, focusing on a specific operational domain, or only suitable for different analysis techniques. For example, domain-specific ADLs have been presented to deal with embedded and real-time systems (such as AADL, EAST-ADL, and EADL), control-loop applications (DiaSpec), product line architectures (Koala), and dynamic systems (Π-ADL)). Analysis-specific ADLs have been proposed to deal with availability, reliability, security, resource consumption, data quality and real-time performance analysis (AADL, behavioral analysis (Fractal)), and trustworthiness analysis (TADL).

However, these efforts have not seen the desired adoption by industrial practice. Some reasons for this lack of industry adoption have been analyzed by Woods and Hilliard, Pandey, Clements, and others: formal ADLs have been rarely integrated in the software life-cycle, they are seldom supported by mature tools, scarcely documented, focusing on very specific needs, and leaving no space for extensions enabling the addition of new features.

As a way to overcome some of those limitations, UML has been indicated as a possible successor of existing ADLs. Many proposals have been presented to use or extend the UML to more properly model software architectures.

A 2013 study found that practitioners were generally satisfied with the design capabilities of the ADLS they used, but had several major concerns with them: they lacked analysis features and the ability to define extra-functional properties; those used in practice mostly originated from industrial development rather than academic research; they needed more formality and better usability.

== Characteristics ==
There is a large variety in ADLs developed by either academic or industrial groups. Many languages were not intended to be an ADL, but they turn out to be suitable for representing and analyzing an architecture. In principle, ADLs differ from requirements languages, because ADLs are rooted in the solution space, whereas requirements describe problem spaces. They differ from programming languages, because ADLs don't bind architectural abstractions to specific point solutions. Modeling languages represent behaviors, where ADLs focus on representation of components. However, there are domain-specific modeling languages (DSMLs) that focus on representation of components.

Minimal requirements

The language must:

- Be suitable for communicating an architecture to all interested parties
- Support the tasks of architecture creation, refinement and validation
- Provide a basis for further implementation, so it must be able to add information to the ADL specification to enable the final system specification to be derived from the ADL
- Provide the ability to represent most of the common architectural styles
- Support analytical capabilities or provide quick generating prototype implementations

ADLs have in common:

- Graphical syntax with often a textual form and a formally defined syntax and semantics
- Features for modeling distributed systems
- Little support for capturing design information, except through general purpose annotation mechanisms
- Ability to represent hierarchical levels of detail including the creation of substructures by instantiating templates

ADLs differ in their ability to:

- Handle real-time constructs, such as deadlines and task priorities, at the architectural level
- Support the specification of different architectural styles. Few handle object oriented class inheritance or dynamic architectures
- Support the analysis of the architecture
- Handle different instantiations of the same architecture, in relation to product line architectures

=== Positive elements of ADL ===
- ADLs are a formal way of representing architecture
- ADLs are intended to be both human and machine-readable
- ADLs support describing a system at a higher level than previously possible
- ADLs permit analysis and assessment of architectures, for completeness, consistency, ambiguity, and performance
- ADLs can support automatic generation of software systems

=== Negative elements of ADL ===
- There is no universal agreement on what ADLs should represent, particularly as regards the behavior of the architecture
- Representations currently in use are relatively difficult to parse and are not supported by commercial tools
- Most ADLs tend to be very vertically optimized toward a particular kind of analysis

== Common concepts of architecture ==
The ADL community generally agrees that Software Architecture is a set of components and the connections among them. But there are different kind of architectures like:

=== Object connection architecture ===
- Configuration consists of the interfaces and connections of an object-oriented system
- Interfaces specify the features that must be provided by modules conforming to an interface
- Connections represented by interfaces together with call graph
- Conformance usually enforced by the programming language
  - Decomposition — associating interfaces with unique modules
  - Interface conformance — static checking of syntactic rules
  - Communication integrity — visibility between modules

=== Interface connection architecture ===
- Expands the role of interfaces and connections
  - Interfaces specify both "required" and "provided" features
  - Connections are defined between "required" features and "provided" features
- Consists of interfaces, connections and constraints
  - Constraints restrict behavior of interfaces and connections in an architecture
  - Constraints in an architecture map to requirements for a system

Most ADLs implement an interface connection architecture.

== Architecture vs. design ==
Architecture, in the context of software systems, is roughly divided into categories, primarily software architecture, network architecture, and systems architecture. Within each of these categories, there is a tangible but fuzzy distinction between architecture and design. To draw this distinction as universally and clearly as possible, it is best to consider design as a noun rather than as a verb, so that the comparison is between two nouns.

Design is the abstraction and specification of patterns and organs of functionality that have been or will be implemented. Architecture is both a degree higher in abstraction and coarser in granularity. Consequentially, architecture is also more topological (i.e. overall structure and relationship between components) in nature than design (i.e. specific details and implementation), in that it specifies where major components meet and how they relate to one another. Architecture focuses on the partitioning of major regions of functionality into high level components, where they will physically or virtually reside, what off-the-shelf components may be employed effectively, in general what interfaces each component will expose, what protocols will be employed between them, and what practices and high level patterns may best meet extensibility, maintainability, reliability, durability, scalability, and other non-functional objectives. Design is a detailing of these choices and a more concrete clarification of how functional requirements will be met through the delegation of pieces of that functionality to more granular components and how these smaller components will be organized within the larger ones.

Oftentimes, a portion of architecture is done during the conceptualization of an application, system, or network, and may appear in the non-functional sections of requirement documentation. Canonically, design is not specified in requirements, but is rather driven by them.

The process of defining an architecture may involve heuristics, acquired by the architect or architectural team through experience within the domain. As with design, architecture often evolves through a series of iterations, and just as the wisdom of a high level design is often tested when low level design and implementation occurs, the wisdom of an architecture is tested during the specification of a high level design. In both cases, if the wisdom of the specification is called into question during detailing, another iteration of either architecture or design, as the case may be, may become necessary.

In summary, the primary differences between architecture and design are ones of granularity and abstraction, and (consequentially) chronology. (Architecture generally precedes design, although overlap and circular iteration is a common reality.)

== Examples ==
- ArchiMate
- Architecture Analysis & Design Language
- C4 model (software)
- C4InterFlow
- Darwin (ADL)
- EAST-ADL
- Wright (ADL)
- SysADL

== Approaches to system architecture ==
- Academic approach
  - focus on analytic evaluation of architectural models
  - individual models
  - rigorous modeling notations
  - powerful analysis techniques
  - depth over breadth
  - special-purpose solutions
- Industrial approach
  - focus on wide range of development issues
  - families of models
  - practicality over rigor
  - architecture as the big picture in development
  - breadth over depth
  - general-purpose solutions

== See also ==
- AADL
- Darwin
- Scripting language
- SysADL
- Hardware description language
