= Specification tree =

A specification tree shows all specifications of a technical system under development in a hierarchical order.

For a spacecraft system it has the following levels:

- System (requirements) specification - generated by customer
  - System (design to) specification - generated by system responsible prime contractor
    - Subsystem specifications - generated by system responsible prime contractor
      - Assembly specifications - generated by subsystem responsible contractors
        - Unit specifications - generated by subsystem (or assembly) responsible contractors.
