= RMIT Platform Technologies Research Institute =

The RMIT Platform Technologies Research Institute was a major research institute of RMIT University. Using a whole-of-system approach, the Institute's cross-disciplinary research investigates the integration of smart materials and systems into technology platforms to address industry’s future needs.

Institute researchers are contributing to improvements in aged care, predicting severe weather events and optimising logistics, energy and data networks. The Institute's nanotechnology is boosting drug delivery and fuel cells, and a smart cricket ball to assist bowlers.

The Institute was dissolved on 1 January 2016.
