= Harbarian process modeling =

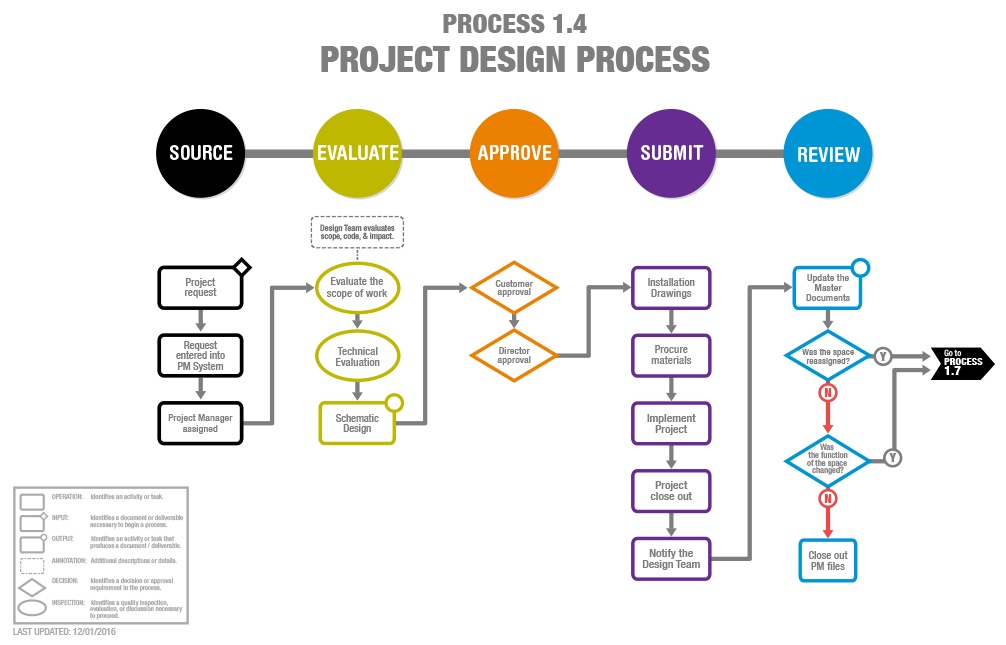
HPM Process Diagram

Harbarian process modeling (HPM) is a method for obtaining internal process information from an organization and then documenting that information in a visually effective, simple manner.

The HPM method involves two levels:

1. Process diagrams: High-level overviews of specific processes or workflows.
2. Systems diagrams: Mapping how each process is correlated, as well as various inputs, outputs, goals, feedback loops, and external factors.

== HPM method purpose ==
The primary purpose of the HPM method is to first elicit process information from all relevant stakeholders and subsequently document existing processes completed within an organization. This method addresses the problem of workplace inefficiency, which can largely be attributed to the majority of processes being undocumented and informally completed.

Formal documentation of processes can reduce ambiguity for stakeholders and for upper management. It can also give stakeholders the opportunity to reassess a process's effectiveness and identify strengths, weaknesses, and redundancies.

== HPM output ==
The final output of the HPM method is the formalized master documentation of an organization's or branch's workflows and processes. This collection is divided into specific process series, each for a specific group or team. Each process series is divided into the team's major workflows which are individually documented into HPM process diagrams. Each process series also includes an HPM systems diagram which shows the relationships and connections between the various processes, inputs, outputs, feedback loops, external environment, and system goals.

=== HPM process diagram ===
HPM process diagrams provide a high-level overview of a specific workflow or process completed by a business unit. These diagrams are not meant to provide detailed instructions on procedures or codes, but instead address all major steps, decisions, and evaluations that are included in a process. Once finalized, these documents can be used as a reference for anyone in the organization. For example:

- The process owners can utilize the diagrams to train new employees.
- Other groups can reference the diagrams for enhanced understanding and communication.
- Upper management can reference the diagrams for increased process transparency and decision-making.

HPM process diagrams can be customized to fit the specific needs of an organization, however, typically include:

- Process title
- Process phases
- Timeline (if applicable)
- Sequential process steps
- Legend/key

=== HPM system diagram ===
HPM system diagrams provide a holistic view of a set of process diagrams. The system focuses on the connections and relationships between various processes. These diagrams also address the system as a collection of:

- Inputs
- Transformations
- Outputs
- Goals
- Feedback
- External factors

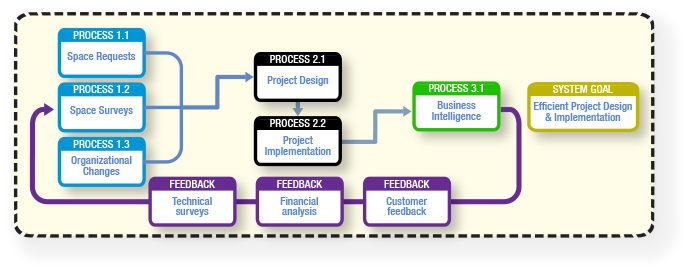
Example of a basic HPM System Diagram

== HPM implementation ==
The HPM method implementation is completed in five main phases. Meetings with stakeholders from organizational teams are conducted to identify major processes, document each process in detail, and develop implementable solutions. Information is elicited from stakeholders and then formally documented into process flowchart diagrams and systems thinking diagrams for use within the organization:

1. initial elicitation and collaboration,
2. preliminary documentation,
3. follow-up elicitation and collaboration,
4. final documentation, and
5. project package submission.

=== Initial elicitation and collaboration ===
The first phase of the HPM method involves scheduling and meeting with each major team that makes up an organization or branch. Meetings are then conducted in the form of an interview and followed a detailed protocol to establish the meeting purpose, convey expected benefits, and to elicit information about the respective team's processes.

Meetings begin with an explanation of the purpose, as well as a list of expected benefits to each team: Clarification should then be given to all questions posed by stakeholders to ensure buy-in from all members of the respective team.

Next, each team should provide a high-level overview of all of the major processes they complete on a regular basis. Each of these processes can then be discussed in detail. The chronological order of tasks for each process is elicited and inputs, outputs, operations, decision points, and evaluations are identified.

=== Preliminary documentation ===
The second phase, preliminary documentation, begins after all process information is elicited from all organizational teams. Each process is then organized and formatted into a HPM process diagram. Processes are designed with a title, overview of process phases, timeline (if applicable), and specific steps in sequential order.

=== Follow-up elicitation & collaboration ===
After all preliminary HPM process diagrams are drafted, follow-up meetings with each of the teams is conducted. These meetings open with a review of the respective team's HPM process diagrams for accuracy. This review also serves as a means to prime stakeholders for the three stages of brainstorming: (1) prepare the group, (2) present the problem, and (3) guide the discussion.

==== Prepare the group ====
Teams are primed for brainstorming through the review of their HPM process diagrams. This step reminds stakeholders about the content being discussed and allows them to think about each process in detail, reviewing what works well and what may be improved. Additionally, the time between the initial interview and follow-up meeting should have provided each stakeholder with the opportunity to independently think about the processes.

==== Present the problem ====
Once prepared for brainstorming, teams are tasked with problem identification. While the act of formally documenting processes innately addresses existing problems with process efficiency and ambiguity, brainstorming is meant to focus on further solving these problems. This involves a brief independent reflection for each stakeholder of their existing processes' efficacy, strengths, and areas that could be or need to be improved.

==== Guide the discussion ====
To facilitate the brainstorming session, teams are guided through the four stages of AI: (1) discovery, (2) dream, (3) design, and (4) destiny. Each stage consists of a discussion guided with specific AI-based questions crafted to elicit ideas and solutions founded out of positivity.

===== Discovery =====
The first stage, discovery, appraises stakeholders and existing workflows, identifying what already works well and "appreciating and valuing the best of 'what is'". Stakeholders are asked AI-based questions designed to elicit the best of their respective team. For example, stakeholders could identify personal strengths of specific stakeholders, strong points within existing processes, and environmental factors that enabled the team to operate at their best.

===== Dream =====
The second stage, dream, asks teams to envision a future based on the positives discovered in the first stage of AI. Questions posed to teams allow them to explore optimistic possibilities of what could be accomplished while intentionally overlooking deficits and struggles that existed in the past. For example, stakeholders could envision what their team would be able to accomplish when operating at their best or what factors would enable the team to operate with an elevated sense of purpose.

===== Design =====
The third stage, design, focuses on teams articulating how they could turn what was identified in the dream stage into a reality. indicate that "once strategic focus or dream is articulated attention turns to the creation of the ideal organization" and the "actual design of the system" (p. 10). Questions should focus on action planning and identifying where specific improvements could be made within existing processes to make their optimistic futures tangible. Where the dream stage asked stakeholders to overlook deficits and struggles, the design stage asked stakeholders to develop new solutions that fixed or bypassed existing issues by using the teams' strengths.

===== Destiny =====
The fourth stage, destiny, concludes the AI process by having teams develop a plan to sustain what was identified in the first three stages. Utilizing the positive momentum built throughout the brainstorming session, stakeholders are likely to agree to perform specific actions. Cognitive dissonance theory postulates that by making a public commitment of behavioral intent, stakeholders will feel a strong need to maintain consistency between their words and their actions. For this reason, questions focus on eliciting self-identified commitments from stakeholders. For example, stakeholders were asked to identify a small action they could each do immediately to help make their envisioned future become a reality. These answers served as public commitments to the rest of their team.

=== Final documentation ===
At this point, all relevant information has been elicited from the organizational teams and is ready to be documented. First, HPM process diagrams should be updated to reflect feedback and insights from stakeholders. Second, the collective HPM process diagrams of each team are reviewed and analyzed. Systems thinking is then applied to identify a "deeper understanding of the linkages, relationships, interactions and behaviours among the elements that characterize the entire system".

== Business psychology concepts ==
The HPM method utilizes four core concepts derived from business psychology: (a) flowcharts, (b) brainstorming, (c) appreciative inquiry (AI), and (d) systems thinking.

=== Flowcharts ===
Flowcharts are "easy-to-understand diagrams that show how the steps of a process fit together". They provide a visual reference to stakeholders so that steps can clearly be followed in a chronological order. Flowcharts are "used commonly with non-technical audiences and are good for gaining both alignment with what the process is and context for a solution".

This neuroscience tool was incorporated into the HPM method for its numerous applications: (a) defining a process, (b) standardizing a process, (c) communicating a process, (d) identifying bottlenecks or waste in a process, (e) solving a problem, and (f) improving a process. Flowcharts provide a useful and straightforward visual reference for all members of an organization. Utilizing flowcharts offers increased process transparency and decreased ambiguity, often resulting in an increase to overall workplace efficiency.

=== Brainstorming ===
Brainstorming is an effective neuroscience tool that can be used with groups to generate ideas that draw on the experience and strengths of all stakeholders. This tool was incorporated into the HPM method for its potential to provide teams with the opportunity to "open up possibilities and break down incorrect assumptions about the problem's limits." Additionally, studies have shown that groups that engage in brainstorming "can be cognitively stimulated as a result of exposure to the ideas of others". This implies there is a synergistic relationship among stakeholders' individual strengths and the ideas generated throughout a brainstorming session.

=== Appreciative inquiry and the 4-D cycle ===
Appreciative inquiry (AI) is based on recognizing a "positive core" by appreciating the qualities and strengths of the people who make up an organization. assert that "human systems grow in the direction of what they persistently ask questions about and this propensity is strongest and most sustainable when the means and ends of inquiry are positively correlated" (pp. 3–4). This implies that asking positive and optimistic questions will likely guide a group or organization towards a positive, optimistic future.

AI involves four key stages, known as the 4-D cycle: (1) discovery, (2) dream, (3) design, and (4) destiny. Each stage engages stakeholders in appreciating their organization, constructing a holistic appreciation for the people they work with, and creating a "positive core" that allows the organization to change and grow.

AI was incorporated into the HPM method for its promotion of positive perspectives to stakeholders., the creators of AI, assert that AI focuses on the positive philosophy behind the approach rather than viewing AI solely as a problem-solving technique. AI-based questions can be used to elicit constructive ideas and solutions from stakeholders throughout the elicitation portion of the project.

=== Systems thinking ===
Systems thinking is a theory that provides stakeholders with an "understanding [of] how the people, processes, and technology within an organization interact allow[ing] business analysts to understand the enterprise from a holistic point of view". While traditional forms of analysis look at specific parts of a system, systems thinking looks at the "big picture," focusing on the interactions between parts including dependencies and synergistic relationships.

While there are many approaches and models of systems thinking, provide an open system (systems theory) that analyzes a system by its (a) inputs, (b) throughputs or transformations, (c) outputs, (d) feedback, and (e) environment. This model has been adapted for use in analyzing each of the organizational teams as a system through their (a) inputs, (b) transformations, (c) outputs, (d) feedback loops, (e) goals, and (f) environment.
