= Marc Lankhorst =

Dutch computer scientist

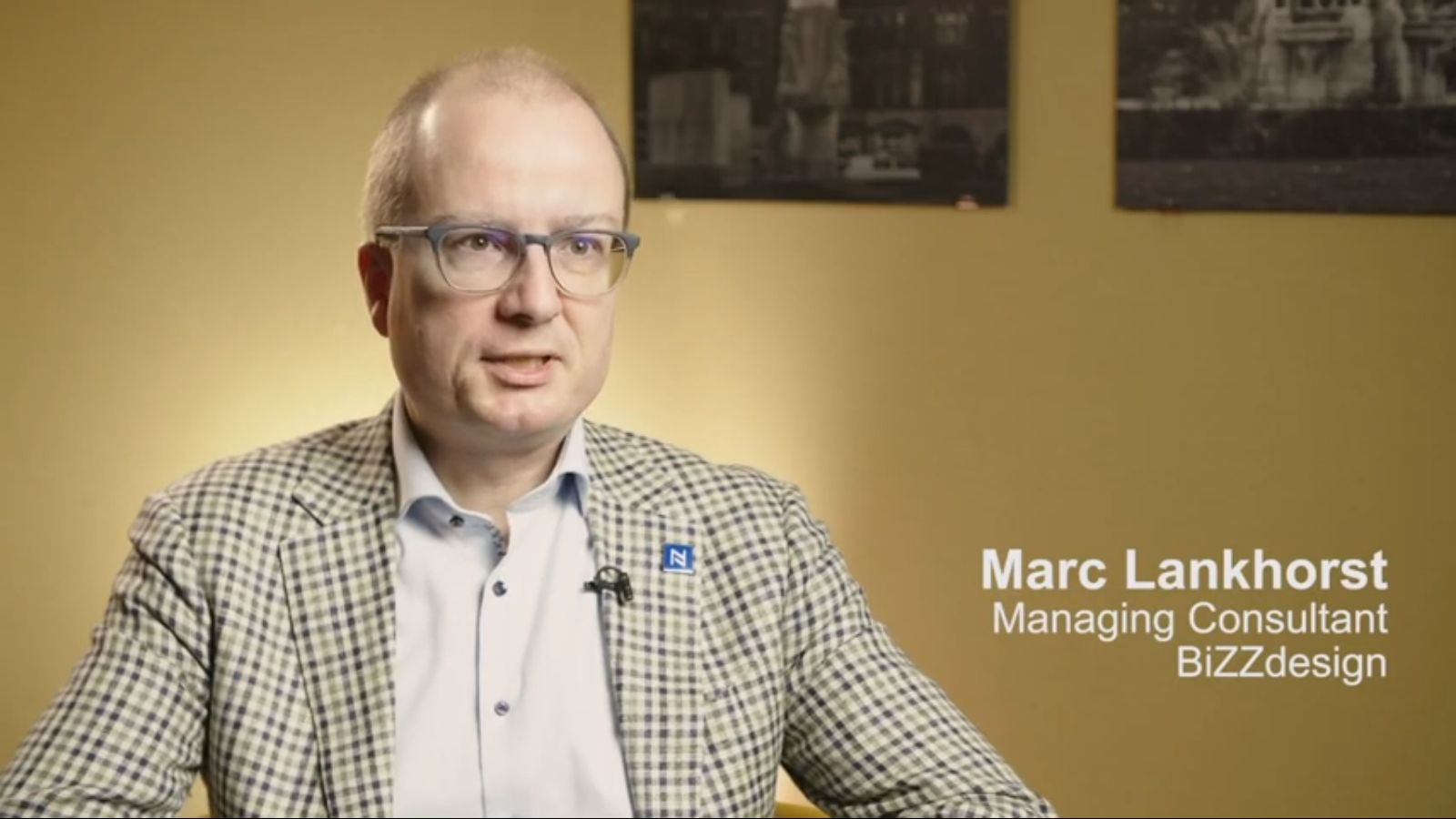
Marc Lankhorst presented "What's New with ArchiMate® 3.1 Modeling Language" at The Open Group, 9 December 2019.

Marc Martijn Lankhorst (born 1968) is a Dutch computer scientist, researcher and consultant, known for his publications on enterprise architecture, and as key developer of ArchiMate, a modelling language for enterprise architecture.

== Biography ==
Born in Naaldwijk, Lankhorst received his MS in computer science in 1991 at the University of Twente, and his PhD in 1996 at the University of Groningen with a thesis entitled "Genetic algorithms in data analysis" under supervision of Nicolai Petkov.

After graduation Lankhorst started his academic career as faculty member at the Department of Mathematics and Computing Science of the University of Groningen. In 1996 he started working at the Telematica Instituut as Member of Scientific Staff, in 2000 he became Manager Application Engineering, in 2006 Expertise Group Leader, and in 2009 Principal Advisor. By then the Institute had changed its name to Novay. From 2003 to 2007 he was also Module Manager at the Delft TopTech, School Executive Education of the Delft University of Technology. In October 2013, he left Novay and joined BiZZdesign.

At the Telematica Instituut between 2002 and 2004 Lankhorst managed the development of enterprise architecture modeling language ArchiMate, in cooperation with representatives from government, industry and academia.

In 2013 Lankhorst is representative of the Netherlands Architecture Forum at the Federation of Enterprise Architecture Professional Organizations.

== Publications ==
Lankhorst has authored and coauthored numerous publications in his field of expertise. Books, a selection:

- Marc Lankhorst. Genetic algorithms in data analysis Doctoral thesis University of Groningen, 1996.
- Marc Lankhorst et al. Enterprise Architecture at Work - Modelling, Communication and Analysis. Berlin: Springer-Verlag, 2005.
- Marc Lankhorst. Agile Service Development - Combining Adaptive Methods and Flexible Solutions. With others (ed.). Berlin: Springer-Verlag, 2012.

Articles, a selection:

- Jonkers, H., Lankhorst, M., Van Buuren, R., Hoppenbrouwers, S., Bonsangue, M., & Van Der Torre, L. (2004). "Concepts for modeling enterprise architectures." International Journal of Cooperative Information Systems, 13(03), 257−287.
- Marc Lankhorst, Roel Wieringa and Henk Jonkers. et al. "Enterprise architecture: Management tool and blueprint for the organisation." Information Systems Frontiers 8.2 (2006): 63−66.
