= Henry Franken =

Dutch engineer and businessman

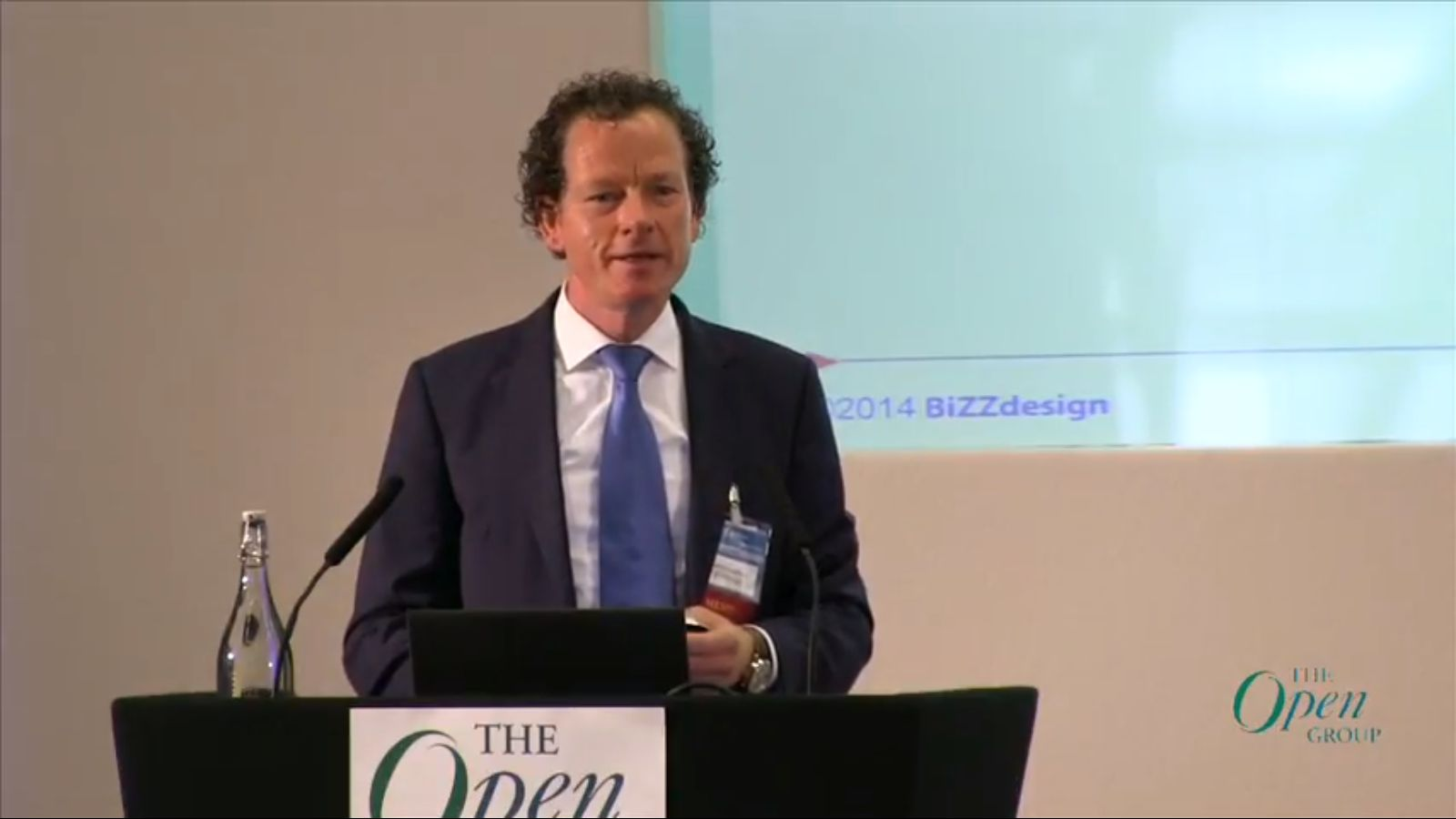
Henry Franken, CEO, BizzDesign, Netherlands at The Open Group. AEA - Strategic Alignment Survey Results, 2014

Hendrik Marinus (Henry) Franken (born 1966) is a retired Dutch engineer, enterprise architect and co-founder and former managing director of BiZZdesign, known for his work in the field of systems and control engineering, and business process management.

== Biography ==
Franken received his MA in Electrical Engineering in 1990 from the University of Twente. He specialized in systems and control engineering, and in 1994 received his PhD with a thesis entitled "Control system design for walking neuroprostheses."

After graduation Franken started as researcher at the Telematica Instituut, where from 1996 to 2001 he participated in the Testbed research project to develop a virtual test environment for business processes. In 2001 he founded BiZZdesign with Harmen van den Berg and Harm Bakker In 2001 to 2003 he was also Enterprise architecture consultant for the ING Group. Since 2009 he chairs The Open Group ArchiMate Forum, a working group that guides the further development of the ArchiMate modeling languages.

== Selected publications ==
Books:

- 1994. Control system design for walking neuroprostheses. Thesis University of Twente.
- 1996. On engineering support for business process modelling and redesign. Enschede : Centre for Telematics and Information Technology
- 2005. Business Process Management (BPM) : procesinzicht en procesverbetering. With Martijn J. Tolsma. Enschede : BiZZdesign.

Articles, a selection:

- Franken, H. M., Veltink, P. H., Tijsmans, R., Nijmeijer, H., & Boom, H. B. (1993). "Identification of passive knee joint and shank dynamics in paraplegics using quadriceps stimulation." Rehabilitation Engineering, IEEE Transactions on, 1(3), 154-164.
- Quartel, D. A., Pires, L. F., Van Sinderen, M. J., Franken, H. M., & Vissers, C. A. (1997). "On the role of basic design concepts in behaviour structuring." Computer networks and ISDN systems, 29(4), 413-436.
- Franken, Henry M., and Wil Janssen. "Get a grip on changing business processes." Knowledge and process management 5.4 (1998): 208-215.
- Franken, H. M., Bal, R., den van Berg, H., Janssen, W., & De Vos, H. (2000). Architectural design support for business process and business network engineering. International Journal of Services Technology and Management, 1(1), 1-14.
