= Annenberg Center on Communication Leadership & Policy =

The Annenberg Center on Communication Leadership and Policy (CCLP) at the University of Southern California promotes interdisciplinary research in communications between the USC School of Cinematic Arts, Viterbi School of Engineering, and the separate USC Annenberg School for Communication and Journalism, also funded by Walter Annenberg.

CCLP focuses on journalism, civic discourse, global press freedom and other issues. In April 2025, longtime journalist Sewell Chan was named a senior fellow at the Annenberg Center.

CCLP hosts events for students and the general public. In July 2025, it hosted the Wildfire Youth Media Initiative in Santa Monica, California, training students in trauma-informed interviewing and the role of journalism in civic society.

== Personnel ==
People affiliated with the CCLP include Julian Bleecker, John Seely Brown, Vinton Cerf, Bill Dutton, John Gage, Joi Ito, Merlyna Lim, Eli Noam, Howard Rheingold, Adrienne Russell, Larry Smarr, Robert Stein, Douglas Thomas, and Robert Winter. As of 2026, USC professor Geoffrey Cowan is the director of the CCLP.

== History ==
In 2007, it was announced that the focus of the CCLP funding strategy would undergo a major shift towards primarily funding graduate fellowships in interdisciplinary research, with $4 million annually planned for 100+ graduate fellowships based on funding from the Annenberg Foundation.
