= Guizzardi =

Guizzardi is an Italian-language surname. Notable people with the surname include:

- Giancarlo Guizzardi (born 1975), Brazilian–Italian computer scientist
- Giuseppe Guizzardi (1779–1861), Italian painter
- Laurindo Guizzardi (1934–2020), Brazilian Roman Catholic prelate
