= Lankhorst =

Lankhorst may refer to:

== People ==
- Henk Lankhorst (1914-1976), Dutch politician
- Marc Lankhorst (b. 1968), Dutch computer scientist
- Peter Lankhorst (b. 1947), Dutch politician

== Places ==
- Lankhorst - a hamlet near the city of Meppel
