= University of Twente =

University in The Netherlands

- Universiteit Twente
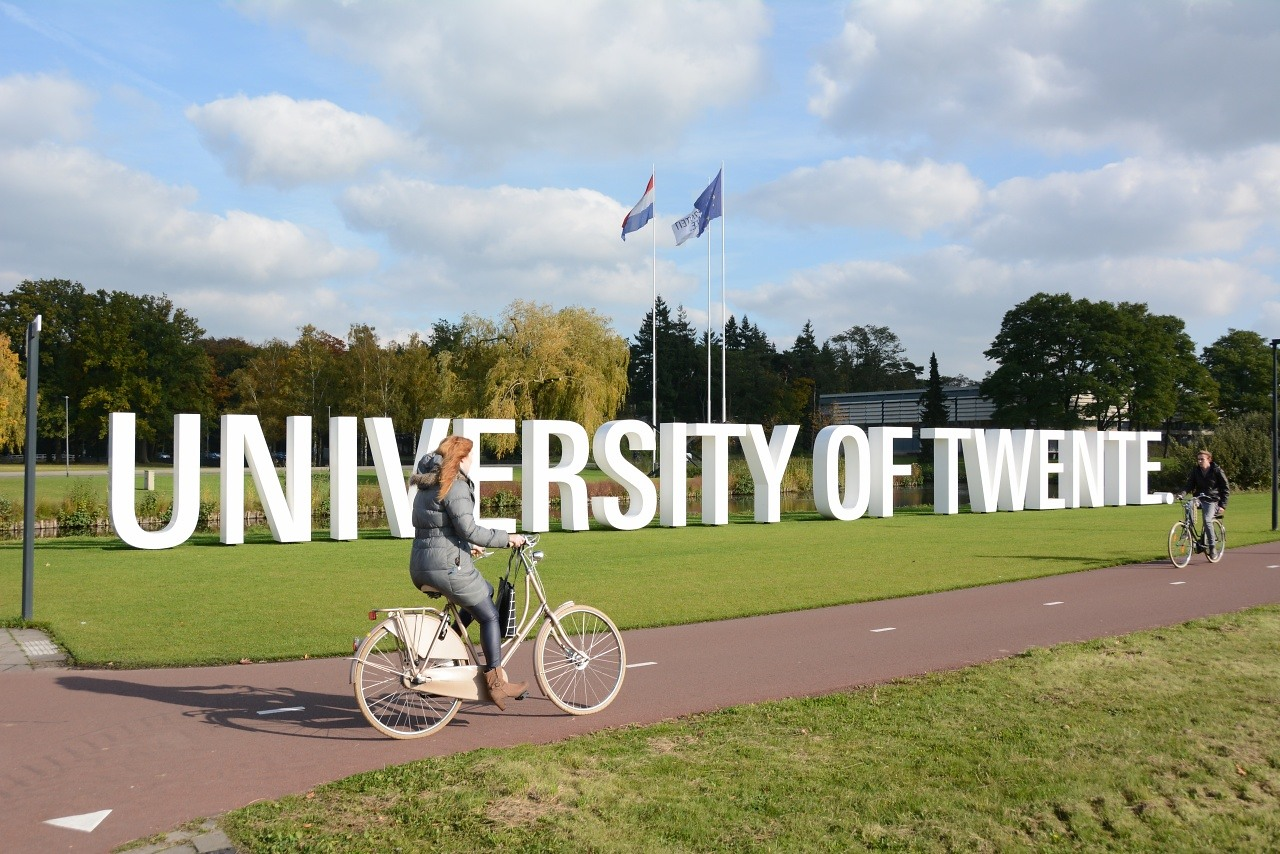
- Former name: Technische Hogeschool Twente
- Motto in English: High Tech, Human Touch
- Type: Public
- Established: 1961
- Affiliations: 4TU, CESAER, ECIU, EUA
- Budget: € 365 M
- Rector: Tom Veldkamp
- Administrative staff: 3,150 (2019)
- Students: 12,544 (2020)
- Location: Enschede, Netherlands; 52°14′33″N 06°51′09″E
- Colours: UT Black and UT White
- Website: www.utwente.nl/en

The University of Twente (Dutch: Universiteit Twente [ynivɛrsiˌtɛi(t) ˈtʋɛntə]; abbr. UT) is a public technical university located in Enschede, Netherlands. The university has been placed in the top 170 universities in the world by multiple central ranking tables. In addition, the UT was ranked the best technical university in the Netherlands by Keuzegids Universiteiten, the most significant national university ranking. The UT collaborates with Delft University of Technology, Eindhoven University of Technology and the Wageningen University and Research Centre under the umbrella of 4TU and is also a partner in the European Consortium of Innovative Universities (ECIU).

== History ==
The university was founded in 1961 as Technische Hogeschool Twente (THT). After Delft University of Technology and Eindhoven University of Technology, it became the third polytechnic institute in the Netherlands to become a university. The institution was later renamed to Universiteit Twente (University of Twente) in 1986, as the result of the changes in the Dutch Academic Education Act in 1984.

The Dutch government's decision to locate the country's third technical university in Enschede, the main city of Twente, had much to do with the north-eastern province's rich manufacturing industry (textiles, metal, electrical engineering, chemicals). Another important consideration was that the local economy needed a boost to compensate for the dwindling textile industry. The municipality of Enschede made the Drienerlo estate available for the first campus University of the Netherlands.

== Campus ==
The University of Twente was built on the former country estate of Drienerlo, situated between Hengelo and Enschede. The 140-hectare (345 acre) estate consists of woodland, meadows and water. Architects Van Tijen and Van Embden designed the first — and so far only — Dutch campus university along American lines where students and staff live, work and pursue their leisure activities on campus.

The Student Union, which is run entirely by students, manages several premises, including the student social centre (De Pakkerij) and study centre (Wallstreet) in Enschede and The Water sports complex on the Twentekanaal.

== Rankings ==
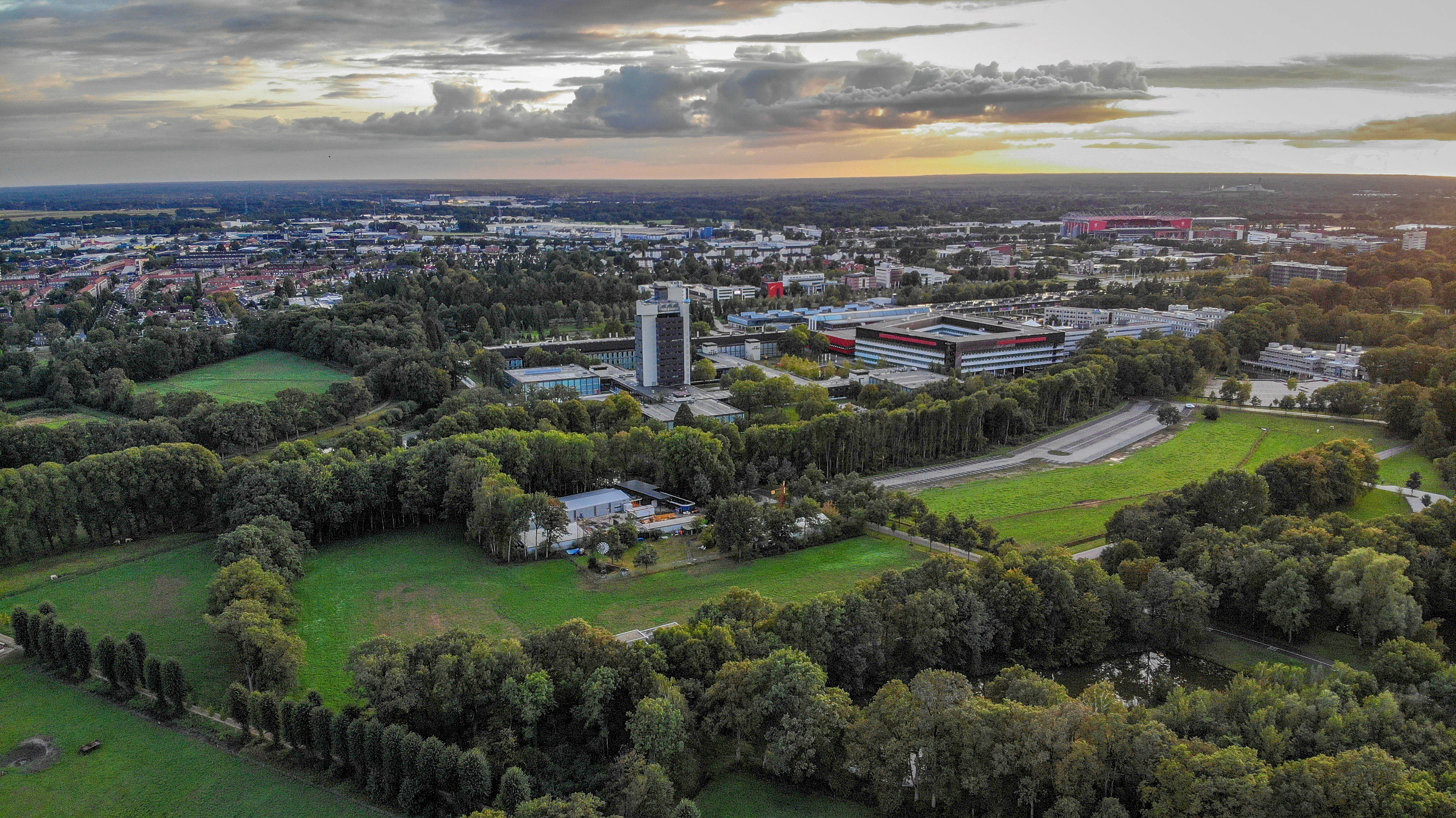
The campus of the University of Twente

According to the Times Higher Education Ranking, the University of Twente is considered one of the 200 most prestigious universities globally. The university performed particularly strongly in the Industry, Innovation and Infrastructure 2021 ranking. Here, the university was ranked eleventh in the world rankings. At the same time, psychology and social sciences also performed well, receiving 101–125 in the world rankings.

University rankings

Global – Overall
- ARWU World: 401-500 (2024)
- CWUR World: 425 (2023)
- CWTS World: 489 (2023)
- QS World: =203 (2026)
- THE World: =180 (2025)
- USNWR Global: =412 (2025)

In the Shanghai Ranking 2021, the University of Twente's Geoinformation and Earth Observation Sciences were awarded. In the field of remote sensing, the university landed among the top ten universities in the world. The commitment in this area will be further expanded in the coming years.

According to Keuzegids Universiteiten, the most significant national university ranking, the University of Twente is the best technical university in the Netherlands.

== Organization ==
=== Administration ===
The current rector magnificus of the university is professor Tom Veldkamp. The other two members of the executive board are Vinod Subramaniam (president of the executive board) and Machteld Roos (vice-president)

=== Faculties ===
There are five faculties at the University of Twente; each faculty is in turn organized into several departments:

- Behavioural, Management and Social Sciences (BMS) – i.a. Communication studies, psychology, public administration, educational science & technology, European studies, environmental & energy management and Risk management
- Engineering Technology (ET) – i.a. Mechanical engineering, civil engineering, industrial design engineering and sustainable energy technology.
- Electrical Engineering, Mathematics and Computer Science (EEMCS) – i.a. Electrical engineering, applied mathematics, interaction technology, internet science & Technology and computer science.
- Technische Natuurwetenschappen (TNW) : Applied Natural Science and Technology – i.a. Chemical engineering, applied physics, biomedical engineering, health sciences, advanced technology and nanotechnology.
- Faculty of Geo-information Sciences and Earth Observation (ITC) – i.a. spatial engineering, cartography, geo-information science & earth observation.

Next to the programmes administered by the faculties mentioned above, University College Twente offers the broad honours BSc programme in Technology and Liberal Arts and Sciences, or ATLAS for short, and the Twente Graduate School offers post graduate education (PhD and PDEng). Since 2019, this study is part of the faculty ITC.

=== Bachelor's and master's degrees ===
The University of Twente has the following faculties with corresponding bachelor- and master programmes:

BMS (Behavioural, Management & Social Sciences)

- Bachelor programmes
  - Communication Science
  - Educational Science and Technology
  - Industrial Engineering and Management
  - International Business Administration
  - Management, Society & Technology
  - Psychology
- Master programmes
  - Business Administration
  - Communication Science
  - Educational Science and Technology
  - European Studies (incl. Double Diploma)
  - Leraar VHO Maatschappijleer en Maatschappijwetenschappen
  - Industrial Engineering and Management
  - Psychology
  - Philosophy of Science, Technology and Society
  - Public Administration
  - Science Education and Communication
  - Environmental and Energy Management
  - Research Master Methodology and Statistics for the BBSS

ET (Engineering Technology)

- Bachelor programmes
  - Civil Engineering
  - Industrial Design Engineering
  - Mechanical Engineering
- Master programmes
  - Civil Engineering and Management
  - Construction Management and Engineering
  - Industrial Design Engineering
  - Mechanical Engineering
  - Sustainable Energy Technology

EEMCS (Electrical Engineering, Mathematics & Computer Science) (a.k.a. EWI)

- Bachelor programmes
  - Applied Mathematics
  - Business Information Technology
  - Technical Computer Science
  - Creative Technology
  - Electrical Engineering
- Master programmes
  - Applied Mathematics
  - Business Information Technology
  - Computer Science
  - Electrical Engineering
  - Embedded Systems
  - Interaction Technology
  - Robotics
  - Internet Science and Technology

ST (Science and Technology) (a.k.a. TNW)

- Bachelor programmes
  - Applied Physics (Dutch, Technische Natuurkunde)
  - Chemical Science & Engineering
  - Biomedical Engineering (Dutch, Biomedische technologie)
  - Technical Medicine (Dutch, Technische geneeskunde)
  - Advanced Technology
  - Health Sciences (Dutch, Gezondheidswetenschappen)
- Master programmes
  - Applied Physics
  - Biomedical Engineering
  - Chemical Engineering
  - Nanotechnology
  - Technical Medicine
  - Health Sciences

ITC (International Institute for Geo-Information Science and Earth Observation)

- Bachelor programmes
  - Technology and Liberal Arts & Sciences (ATLAS)
- Master programmes
  - Geo-information Science and Earth Observation
  - Spatial Engineering
  - Geographical Information Management and Applications
  - International Joined Master in Cartography (with TUM, TUW and TUD) See: https://cartographymaster.eu/

== Academics ==
=== Research ===
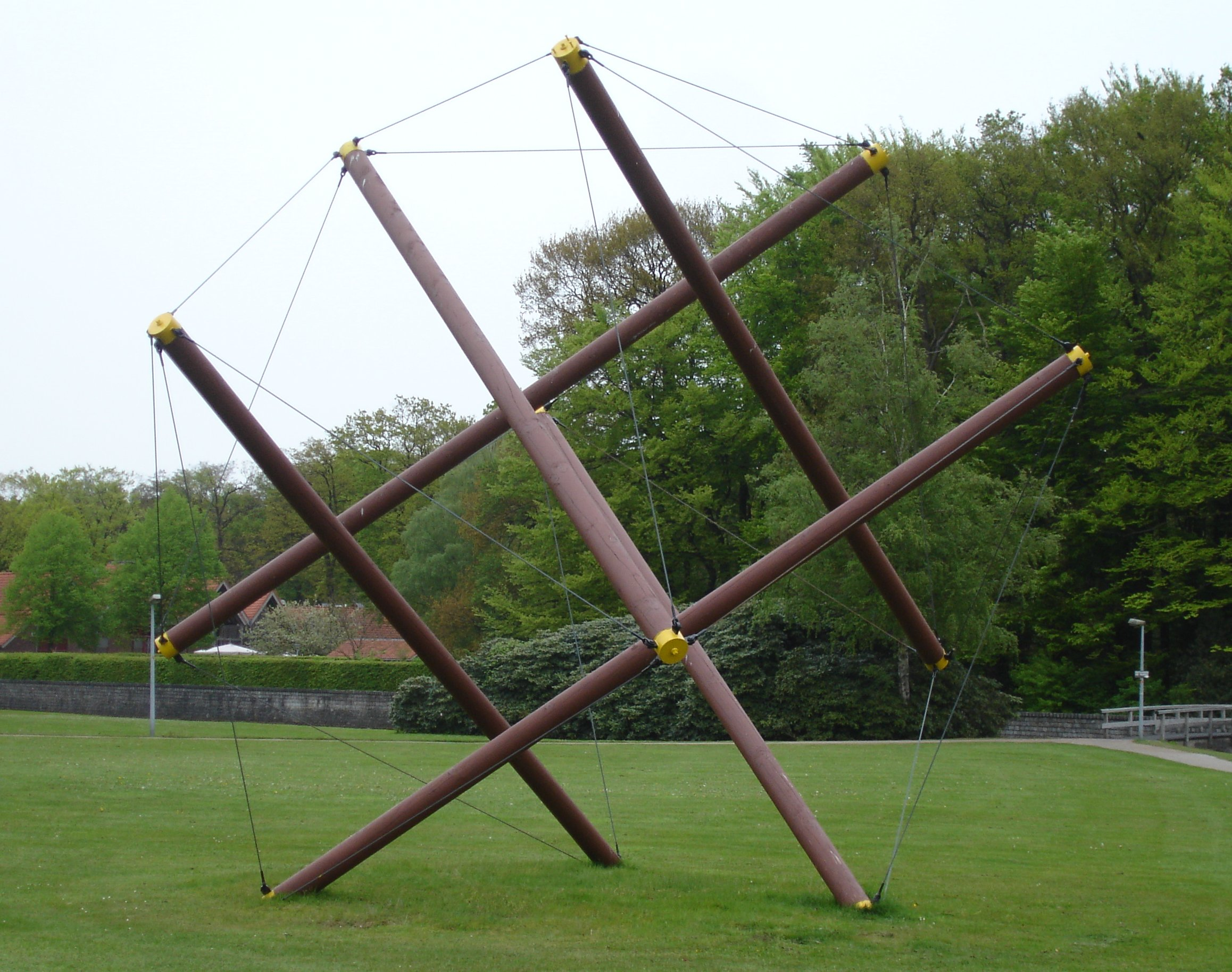
"Het Ding" "(The Thing)", by Jasper Latté and Jaap Hos

==== Research institutes ====
- MESA+ Institute for Nanotechnology
- TechMed Centre
- Digital Society Institute (DSI)

==== Knowledge and research centres ====
- Center for Philosophy of Technology and Engineering Science (CEPTES)
- Center for European Studies (CES)
- Center for Higher Education Policy Studies (CHEPS)
- Center for healthcare operations improvement & research (CHOIR)
- Centre for integrated manufacturing and development (CIPV)
- Center for clean technology and environmental policy (CSTM)
- Nikos – Dutch institute for knowledge intensive entrepreneurship
- Science, Technology, and Policy Studies (STePS)
- Twente Water Centre (TWC)
- 4TU Resilience Engineering Centre
- 4TU Centre of Excellence for Ethics and Technology
- Max Planck Center for Fluid Dynamics

=== Education ===
The degree programs at the University of Twente range from business administration and psychology to applied physics, engineering and biomedical technology.

In the applied sciences, the emphasis is on nanotechnology, process technology, engineering, information and communication technology, and the biomedical sciences.

So far, the UT has produced over 1,000 spin-off companies and start-up companies; more than any other Dutch university. UT is also one of the founders of Novel-T, formerly Stichting Kennispark Twente, a startup accelerator and support program for university spin-offs.

== Timeline of rectors ==
- 1963–1967: Gerrit Berkhoff (d. 1996)
- 1967–1971: Jo Vlugter
- 1971–1974: Pieter Zandbergen
- 1974–1976: Jan Kreiken (d. 2001)
- 1976–1979: Izak Willem van Spiegell (d. 2005)
- 1979–1982: Harry van den Kroonenberg (d. 1996)
- 1982–1985: Wiebe Draijer (d. 2007)
- 1985–1988: Harry van den Kroonenberg (second term)
- 1988–1992: Jos de Smit
- 1992–1997: Theo Popma (d. 2013)
- 1997–2004: Frans van Vught
- 2005–2009: Henk Zijm
- 2009–2016: Ed Brinksma
- 2016–2020: Thom Palstra
- 2020–present: Tom Veldkamp

== Notable alumni ==
- Albert van den Berg, professor of physics and 2009 winner of the Spinoza Prize
- Ank Bijleveld, Dutch politician – Minister of Defence
- Bas Lansdorp, co-founder and CEO of Mars One
- Cees Links, Wi-Fi Innovator
- Dirk-Willem van Gulik, founder of the Apache Software Foundation
- Fred Teeven, former Dutch politician – State Secretary for Security and justice
- Giancarlo Guizzardi, creator of the Unified Foundational Ontology and the OntoUML language
- Gom van Strien, Dutch politician – member of the Senate
- Han Polman, Dutch politician – King's Commissioner of Zeeland
- Henry Franken, co-founder and managing director of BiZZdesign
- Iain Baikie, professor of physics and winner of the Swan Medal
- Jaap Haartsen, inventor of Bluetooth
- Marleen Veldhuis, swimmer – Olympic, World and European Champion
- Merlyna Lim, professor, Canada Research Chair, and member of Royal Society of Canada College
- Peter Flach, professor of artificial intelligence at the University of Bristol
- Yasemin Çegerek, MP of the Labour Party
- Jitse Groen, founder of Takeaway.com
- Mary Goretti Kitutu, Minister of Energy and Mineral Development, Uganda
- Piet Bergveld, inventor of the ion-sensitive field-effect transistor (ISFET) sensor
