= Merlyna Lim =

Canada Research Chair

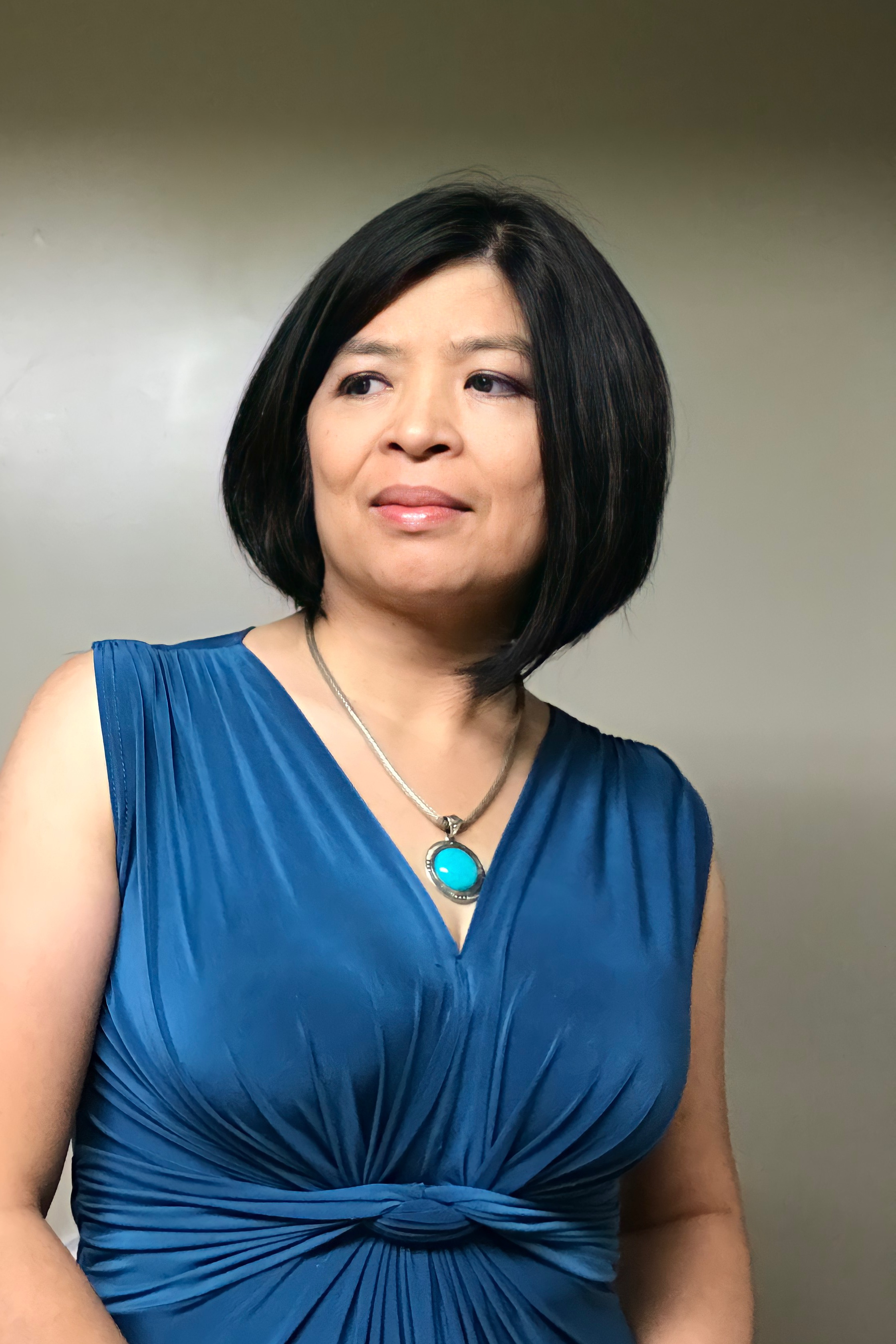
- Occupation: academia
- Known for: Canada Research Chair in Digital Media and Global Network Society in the School of Journalism and Communication Carleton University, Canada.
- Spouse: 1

Merlyna Lim is a scholar studying ICT (information and communication studies), particularly on the socio-political shaping of new media in non-Western contexts. She has been appointed a Canada Research Chair in Digital Media and Global Network Society in the School of Journalism and Communication Carleton University. Formerly she was a visiting research scholar at Princeton University's Center for Information Technology Policy and a distinguished scholar of technology and public engagement of the School of Social Transformation Justice and Social Inquiry Program and the Consortium for Science, Policy and Outcomes at Arizona State University. She previously held a networked public research associate position at the Annenberg Center for Communication at the University of Southern California, Los Angeles. She received her PhD, with distinction (cum laude), from University of Twente in Enschede, Netherlands, with a dissertation entitled @rchipelago Online: The Internet and Political Activism in Indonesia.

== Awards and honors ==
- 2021 Featured as one of research leaders of the Asian Heritage Month in Canada
- 2020 International Women’s Day Top 10 Women Leaders and Researchers
- 2020 One of 100 Most Influential Alumni of ITB Bandung Institute of Technology
- 2019 Graduate Mentoring Award, Carleton University
- 2017 First place, People’s Choice Award, the Jackson’s Art International Urban Sketching Competition
- 2016 Elected a member of Royal Society of Canada's College of New Scholars, Artists and Scientists
- 2014 Canada Research Chair in Digital Media and Global Network Society
- 2013 Visiting Fellowship, Princeton University's Center for Information Technology Policy
- 2011 Selected as one of Indonesian 100 Most Inspiring Women—2011 Kartini Awards
- 2010 Our Common Future Fellowship in 'Future Technologies' from the Volkswagen Foundation
- 2009 Faculty Star of Global Minds from ASU College of Liberal Arts and Sciences.
- 2005-2006 Walter Annenberg funded Networked Publics Fellowship, Annenberg Center for Communication, Univ of Southern California, Los Angeles.
- 2004 Henry Luce Foundation funded Southeast Asia Fellowship, East West Center Washington, Washington D.C.
- 2003 Oxford and Open society Institute Summer Doctoral Scholarship at Oxford Internet Institute.
- 2003-2004 WOTRO-DC Fellowship from the Netherlands Foundation for the Advancement of Tropical Research (NWO-WOTRO)
- 2002 American Society of Information Technology and Science (ASIST) International Paper Contest Winner.

== Publications ==
- Lim, M. 2023. From activist media to algorithmic politics: The Internet, Social Media & Civil Society in Southeast Asia, in E. Hansson & M. Weiss (eds.), Routledge Handbook of Civil and Uncivil Society in Southeast Asia (pp. 25–44). New York & London: Routledge.
- Lim, M. 2023. “Everything everywhere all at once”: Social Media, Algorithmic/Marketing Culture, and Activism in Southeast Asia. Georgetown Journal of International Affairs, 24(2): 181-190. https://doi.org/10.1353/gia.2023.a913644.
- Lim, M. 2020. Algorithmic enclaves: Affective politics and algorithms in the neoliberal social media landscape. In M. Boler & E. Davis (eds.), Affective Politics of Digital Media: Propaganda by Other Means (pp. 186–203). New York & London: Routledge.
- Lim, M. 2022. Alternative Imaginations: Confronting and Challenging the Persistent Centrism in Social Media-Society Research. Journal of Asian Social Science Research, 4(1), 1-22. https://doi.org/10.15575/jassr.v4i1.59
- Lim, M. 2022. #Coronaconspiracy: Algorithms, Users, and Conspiracy Theories in Social Media. M/C Journal, 25(1). https://journal.media-culture.org.au/index.php/mcjournal/article/view/2877
- Lim, M. 2020. The politics and perils of dis/connection in the Global South (Crosscurrent: The Limits and Boundaries of Digital Disconnection). Media, Culture & Society. https://doi.org/10.1177/0163443720914032
- Lim, M. 2019. Disciplining Dissent:Freedom, Control, and Digital Activism in Southeast Asia, in R. Padawangi (ed.) Routledge Handbook of Urbanization in Southeast Asia, Routledge, 478-494.
- Lim, M. 2018. Roots, Routes, Routers: Communications and Media of Contemporary Social Movements. Journalism & Communication Monographs Series (Volume 2 Number 2 Summer 2018)
- Lim, M. 2018. Sticks and Stones, Clicks and Phones: Contextualizing the Role of Digital Media in the Politics of Transformation, in C. Richter & C. Harders, & A. Antonakis-Nashif (eds.) Digital Media and the Politics of Transformation in the Arab World and Asia, Berlin: Springer VS, 9-34. [PDF]
- Lim, M. 2018. Dis/Connecting: The co–evolution of socio–cultural and material infrastructures of the internet in Indonesia. Indonesia, 105(April): 155-172.
- Lim, M. 2018. Challenging technological utopianism. Canadian Journal of Communication, 43(3): 375-379. [PDF]
- Mitchell, SSD & Lim, M. 2018. Too Crowded for Crowdsourced Journalism: Reddit and Citizen Participation in the Syrian Crisis. Canadian Journal of Communication, 43(3): 399-419.
- Alrasheed, G. & Lim, M. 2018. Unveiling Saudi Feminism(s): Historicization, Heterogeneity, and Corporeality in the Women’s Movements. Canadian Journal of Communication, 43(3): 461-79.
- Lim, M. 2017. Freedom to Hate: Social Media, Algorithmic Enclaves, and the Rise of Tribal Nationalism in Indonesia. Critical Asian Studies. 49(3): 411-427. http://dx.doi.org/10.1080/14672715.2017.1341188
- Lim, M. 2017. Sweeping the Unclean: Social Media and the Bersih Electoral Reform in Malaysia. Global Media Journal, 14(27).
- Lim, M. 2017. Digital Media and Malaysia’s Electoral Reform Movement, in W. Berenschot, Schulte Nordholt & L. Bakker (eds.), Citizenship and Democratization in Southeast Asia, Leiden: Brill Academic Publisher, 213–239.
- Yuce, S., Agarwal, N., Lim, M., Robinson, R.S., Wigand, R. 2016. Bridging Women Rights Networks: Analyzing Interconnected Online Collective Actions, in Information Resources Management Association (ed.), Politics and Social Activism: Concepts, Methodologies, Tools, and Applications, Hershey PA: IGI Global, 551–571.
- Lim, M. 2015. A Cyber–Urban Space Odyssey: The Spatiality of Contemporary Social Movements. New Geographies, 07: 117–123.
- Yuce, S., Agarwal, N., Lim, M., Robinson, R.S., Wigand, R. 2015. Bridging Women Rights Networks: Analyzing Interconnected Online Collective Actions. Journal of Global Information Management, 22(4): 1–20. http://dx.doi.org/10.4018/jgim.2014100101
- Agarwal, N., Lim, M., Wigand, R. (eds.) 2014. Online Collective Action: Dynamics of the Crowd in Social Media, New York/Heidelberg: Springer.
- Lim, M. 2014. Seeing Spatially: People, Networks and Movements in Digital and Urban Spaces, International Development Planning Review, 36(1): 51–72. http://dx.doi.org/10.3828/idpr.2014.4
- Lim, M. 2013. Framing Bouazizi: White Lies, Hybrid Network, and Collective/Connective Action in the 2010–2011 Tunisian Uprising, Journalism, 14(7): 921-941. http://dx.doi.org/10.1177/1464884913478359
- Lim, M. 2013. Many Clicks but Little Sticks: Social Media Activism in Indonesia, Journal of Contemporary Asia, 43(4): 636–657. http://dx.doi.org/10.1080/00472336.2013.769386.
- Lim, M. 2013. The Internet and Everyday Life in Indonesia: New Moral Panics? Bijdragen tot de Taal–, Land– en Volkenkunde (BKI) / Journal of the Humanities and Social Sciences of Southeast Asia and Oceania, 169(1): 133–147. http://dx.doi.org/10.1163/22134379–12340008. [PDF]
- Lim, M. (2012). Life is Local in the Imagined Global Community: Islam and Politics in the Indonesian Blogosphere, Journal of Media and Religion, Vol. 11(2).
- Lim, M. (2012). Clicks, Cabs, Coffee Houses: Social Media and the Oppositional Movements in Egypt (2004–2011), Journal of Communication, Vol. 62(02, April), 231–248.
- Agarwal, N., Lim, M., & Wigand, R. (2012) Online Collective Action and the Role of Social Media in Mobilizing Opinions: A Case Study on Women's Right-to-Drive Campaigns in Saudi Arabia, in C. G. Reddick & S. K. Aikins (eds.), Web 2.0 Technologies and Democratic Governance: Political, Policy and Management Implications.
- Agarwal, N., Lim, M., & Wigand, R. (2012) Raising and Rising Voices: Cyber-Collective Movements in the Female Muslim Blogosphere, Business & Information Systems Engineering Journal.
- Lim, M. (2011). Democratised/Corporatised: Contesting Media in the Post-Authoritarian Indonesia, in Puddephatt, A. et al., A New Frontier, An Old Landscape, Global Partners & Associates, pp. 156–181.
- Lim, M. (2011) Radical Islamism in Indonesia and Its Middle Eastern Connections, The Middle East Review of International Affairs Journal.
- Lim, M. (2011) Transient Civic Spaces in Jakarta Indonesia in Mike Douglass, KC Ho, Ooi Giok Ling (eds.) Globalization, the City and Civil Society in Pacific Asia, London: Routledge (2nd edition).
- Lim, M. (2009) "Muslim Voices in the Blogosphere: Mosaics of Local-Global Discourses" in Gerard Goggin and Mark McLelland [eds.], Internationalizing Internet: Beyond Anglophone Paradigm, London: Routledge, p. 178-195.
- Lim, M and Padawangi, R. (2008), "Contesting Alun-Alun: Power Relations, Identities, and The Production of Urban Spaces in Bandung, Indonesia" International Development and Planning Review, Vol. 30 (3), pp. 307–326.
- Lim, M. and Kann, M. (2008), "Politics: Deliberation, Mobilization and Networked Practices of Agitation" in K. Varnelis (ed.) Networked Publics, Cambridge: MIT Press, p. 77-107.
- Lim, M. (2008), "Bundling Meta-Narratives on the Internet: Conflict in Maluku" in Shyam Tekwani (ed.), Media and Conflict in Asia, Marshall Cavendish Academic.
- Lim, M (2006). "Lost in Transition: The Internet and Reformasi in Indonesia". In Jodi Dean; Jon Anderson; Geert Lovink (eds.). Reformatting Politics: Networked Communications and Global Civil Society. London: Routledge. pp. 85–106.
- Lim, M (2006). "Cyber-Urban Activism and Political Change in Indonesia". Eastbound Journal. 2006 (1): 1–19.
- Lim, M (2005). Islamic Radicalism and Anti Americanism in Indonesia: The Role of the Internet. Policy Studies. Vol. 18. Washington DC: East West Center. ISBN 978-1-932728-35-4. ISSN 1547-1330.
- Lim, M (2004). "The Polarization of Identity through the Internet and the Struggle for Democracy in Indonesia". Electronic Journal of Communication. 14 (3–4). ISSN 1183-5656.
- Lim, M (2004). "Informational Terrains of Identity and Political Power: The Internet in Indonesia". Indonesian Journal of Social and Cultural Anthropology. XXVII (73, January–April edition): 1–11. ISSN 1693-167X.
- Lim, M (2003). "From War-net to Net-War: The Internet and Resistance Identities in Indonesia". The International Information & Library Review. 35 (2–4). Elsevier Publisher: 233–248. doi:10.1016/S1057-2317(03)00019-5. ISSN 1057-2317.
- Lim, M (2003). K. C. Ho; R. Kluver; C. C. Yang (eds.). From Real to Virtual (and back again): Civil Society, Public Sphere, and Internet in Indonesia. Routledge. pp. 113–128. ISBN 0-415-31503-4.
- Lim, M (2003). "The Internet, Social Network and Reform in Indonesia". In N. Couldry; J. Curran (eds.). Contesting Media Power: Alternative Media in A Networked World. Rowman & Littlefield. pp. 273–288. ISBN 0-7425-2385-3.
- Lim, M (2002). "CyberCivic Space in Indonesia: From Panopticon to Pandemonium". International Development Planning Review. 24 (4). Liverpool University Press: 383–400. doi:10.3828/idpr.24.4.3. ISSN 1474-6743.
- Lim, M (2002). "From Walking City to Telematic Metropolis: Changing Urban Form in Bandung, Indonesia". In Tim Bunnell; Lisa B. W. Drummond; K. C. Ho (eds.). Critical Reflections on Cities in Southeast Asia. Brill Publisher and Times Academic Press. pp. 75–100. ISBN 981-210-192-6.
- Lim, M (2000). "The Benefit of Virtual Space: Informing the Real World Design (Part Two)". Architecture Journal Tatanan: 141–148.
- Lim, M (1999). "The Benefit of Virtual Space: Informing the Real World Design (Part One)". Architecture Journal Tatanan: 41–48.
