= GreenPeak Technologies =

- Type: Private
- Industry: Semiconductors
- Founded: 2005
- Founder: Cees Links
- Headquarters: Utrecht, Netherlands
- Number of locations: Belgium, France, Japan, Korea, United States, China, India
- Products: RF Silicon - Communication controller chips for wireless Smart Home applications & the Internet of Things
- Number of employees: 100
- Website: GreenPeak.com

GreenPeak Technologies was an Utrecht, Netherlands-based fabless company developing semiconductor products and software for the IEEE 802.15.4 and Zigbee wireless market segment. Zigbee technology is used for Smart Home data communications and to facilitate the Internet of Things, the term used to refer to devices designed to be operated and managed by internet-enabled controllers and management systems.

== Industry standards ==
Wireless sensor applications are often based on industry standards, which define interoperability requirements and allow components from different vendors to function together in areas such as building and industrial automation.

GreenPeak's development is based on open industry standards in addition to the IEEE 802.15.4 wireless network standard. GreenPeak is a member of the Global Semiconductor Alliance and supports the open global standards of the Zigbee Alliance.

== Products ==
GreenPeak’s contained communication controller chips for Zigbee Smart Home and IoT applications for IEEE 802.15.4.

== Acquisition by Qorvo ==
On 17 April 2016, it was announced that GreenPeak had agreed to be acquired by Qorvo. After the acquisition, GreenPeak would continue to function in the Netherlands, Belgium and Hong Kong as the "Low-power Wireless Systems" business unit in the Infrastructure and Defense Products (IDP) group of Qorvo. Cees Links, former CEO of GreenPeak Technologies, was announced to take over as the General Manager of the Wireless Connectivity business unit.
