= IYOUIT =

- Screenshot Mobile client
- Developers: Docomo Euro-Labs, Munich and Telematica Instituut, Enschede
- Release: June 26, 2008
- Written in: Python (programming language)
- Operating system: Symbian OS
- Type: Context awareness
- Website: www.iyouit.eu

IYOUIT is a mobile alpha service to share personal experiences with others while on the go. It was released in June 2008 by NTT Docomo Euro-Labs and discontinued in August 2011.

IYOUIT allows for an instant automated sharing of personal experiences within communities online. It offers contextual tagging for use in everyday life. By hooking a mobile phone up to the Web 2.0 services Flickr and Twitter, sharing can be instant, by posting single data items to such services, or through the aggregation of context information in online blogs.

IYOUIT provides users with access to the whereabouts of their friends, informs them about weather conditions and uploads photos taken and sounds recorded. If the user comes across a book (or other products), they can take a picture of the ISBN code or the product ID with the phone's camera, and IYOUIT will fill in the blanks for instant exchange with friends. IYOUIT records scanned Bluetooth or WLAN beacons and aggregates all data into context information that can be shared with others worldwide on the Web and on the mobile phone.

== Software ==
IYOUIT has been developed by NTT Docomo Euro-Labs in Munich together with the Dutch Telematica Instituut in a joint research project on platform support for Context Awareness in mobile services and applications. The application is available from the IYOUIT portal at http://www.iyouit.eu. It is written in Python and runs on the Nokia Series-S60 platform (see PyS60).

IYOUIT is based on its own framework of software components to host services and data sources. Framework components, for instance, track the positions of users via GPS and cellular information and identify places of interest over time by learning form their past behavior. Each component offers an API, which allows programmers to integrate their own third party software components.

== See also ==
- Jaiku
