= Adrienne Russell =

American academic (born 1971)

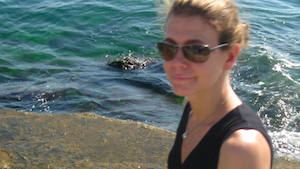
- Russell in Istanbul, 2011
- Born: February 24, 1971 (age 55); Santa Monica, California, US

Academic background
- Education: University of California, Santa Cruz (BA); Stanford University (MS); Indiana University Bloomington (PhD)

Academic work
- Discipline: Communication

Adrienne Russell is an American academic whose work focuses on the digital-age evolution of journalism and activist communication. She is currently Mary Laird Wood Professor in the Department of Communication at the University of Washington and co-director with Matt Powers of the department's Center for Journalism, Media and Democracy.

== Education and career ==
Russell earned a BA in World Literature and Cultural Studies from the University of California, Santa Cruz in 1993, an MS in Media Studies from Stanford University in 1995, and a PhD in Journalism and Mass Communication from Indiana University Bloomington in 2001. Following her PhD, Russell served as an assistant professor in the Department of Global Communication at the American University of Paris (2003 — 2005). She was a research fellow at the Annenberg Center for Communication at the University of Southern California from 2005 until 2007. She then moved to the University of Denver, where she had a joint appointment in Emergent Digital Practices and in the Media, Film, and Journalism department. She then moved to the University of Washington, where she is Mary Laird Wood Professor of Communication.

== Books ==
- Russell, Adrienne (2011). Networked: A Contemporary History of News in Transition. John Wiley & Sons. ISBN 978-0-7456-3773-0.
- Russell, Adrienne (2016). Journalism as Activism: Recoding Media Power. Wiley. ISBN 978-1-5095-1130-3.
- Russell, Adrienne (2023). The Mediated Climate: How Journalists, Big Tech, and Activists Are Vying for Our Future. New York: Columbia University Press. ISBN 978-0231554237.
