= Unified Foundational Ontology =

Ontological framework for conceptual models

The Unified Foundational Ontology (UFO). is an ontological framework developed in the early 2000s with the objective of providing foundational support for conceptual modeling. It synthesizes elements from formal ontology, cognitive science, linguistics, and philosophical logic to inform the structure and semantics of conceptual models. The ontology is utilized to articulate a variety of fundamental notions within conceptual modeling, offering a systematic approach to categorizing entities and delineating their properties.

== Overview ==
Conceived as a response to the needs for ontological foundations in conceptual modeling, UFO consists of a series of interlinked micro-theories that collectively address a comprehensive range of conceptual modeling topics. These micro-theories cover the taxonomy of objects, the nature of part-whole relationships, the articulation of intrinsic and relational properties, and the classification of events and roles among other subjects. UFO is particularly noted for its application in the creation of OntoUML, a conceptual modeling language that embodies the ontology's theoretical constructs.

UFO's development is deeply rooted in philosophical ontology, integrating insights from formal ontology, cognitive science, linguistics, and philosophical logic. This multidisciplinary approach ensures that UFO not only provides a theoretical framework for conceptual modeling but also aligns closely with human cognitive processes and linguistic structures. This alignment is crucial in ensuring that the ontology is both intuitively understandable and practically applicable in various domains.

Recent discussions in the field, such as those presented by Riichiro Mizoguchi and Stefano Borgo in 'The Role of the Systemic View in Foundational Ontologies', emphasize the significance of incorporating a systemic view within foundational ontologies. This perspective is crucial in understanding how entities, as part of a larger system, interact and function dynamically. The systemic view, which focuses on the roles entities play within a system and how they contribute to the system's overall goals and functions, can provide valuable insights into enhancing UFO's framework, particularly in modeling complex interactions and dynamic processes.

== Micro-theories ==
UFO emerged from an endeavor to harmonize theories from formal ontology with the requisites of ontological foundations for conceptual modeling. It incorporates a four-category ontology dealing with various fundamental conceptual modeling notions. The ontology is divided into several micro-theories covering a wide range of topics, including:

- Theory of Types and Taxonomic Structures: This theory delves into the categorization and hierarchical structuring of objects, and is closely tied to a theory concerning object identifiers. It further extends to offer a formal semantics grounded in a sortal quantified modal logic.
- Theory of Part-Whole Relations: This theory explores the relationships between constituent parts and their wholes, providing a structural understanding of complex entities.
- Theory of Particularized Intrinsic Properties, Attributes, and Attribute Value Spaces: This theory articulates the intrinsic properties unique to particular entities, alongside the attributes and the spaces these attributes value occupy. It also presents a perspective on datatypes as semantic reference structures.
- Theory of Particularized Relational Properties and Relations: This explores the properties and relations between entities, offering a profound understanding of how entities relate to one another. Additionally, it introduces a proposal for Weak Truthmaking, linking particularized properties to propositions.
- Theory of Roles: This theory delves into the various roles entities can embody, providing a framework for understanding dynamic and contextual identities.
- Theory of Events: This theory encompasses a comprehensive examination of events, covering aspects like event mereology, temporal ordering, object participation, causation, and change. It elucidates the connection between events and endurants through dispositions.
- Theory for Multi-level Modeling: This theory provides a framework for multi-level modeling, allowing for a nuanced representation and analysis of hierarchical and layered structures.

Each theory forms a part of the extensive conceptual framework offered by the ontology, contributing to a deeper understanding and analysis of domain-specific models.

Initially inspired by seminal work on ontological foundations for conceptual modeling, UFO aimed to address the shortcomings of previous approaches by developing a robust ontological theory for conceptual modeling that encompasses both individuals and types. Over the years, UFO has evolved significantly, being applied in the analysis, re-engineering, and integration of various modeling languages and standards across different domains. However, the extensive scope of UFO's micro-theories, though academically robust, presents challenges in terms of usability and comprehension, especially for those without a formal background in ontology.

Notably, UFO has been used in the design of an ontology-driven conceptual modeling language known as OntoUML, which reflects some of the ontological micro-theories comprising UFO.

== Principles and Structure of UFO ==
UFO was established with the goal of supporting domain analysis in conceptual modeling, aiming at developing a "Calculus of Content" for ontological analysis, conceptual clarification, and semantic explicitation of content embedded in representation artifacts.

UFO seeks to describe reality at a mesoscopic level as accounted for by human cognition, acknowledging both cognitive and linguistic aspects in its constituting categories. It is organized into three main fragments:

- UFO-A: An ontology of endurants.
- UFO-B: An ontology of perdurants.
- UFO-C: An ontology of social and intentional entities built on the foundations provided by the other two fragments.

The ontology distinguishes between endurants and perdurants, with endurants being individuals that exist in time with all their parts, and perdurants being individuals that unfold in time accumulating temporal parts. It also accounts for both independent and dependent endurants, termed substantials and moments, respectively.

UFO further delves into the categorization of endurant types based on the Aristotelian Square, accounting for both substantials and moments, which include intrinsic moments like qualities and modes, and particularized relational properties termed relators.

== Key Research Groups ==
UFO has garnered attention and application across various research groups globally. Prominent among them is the Ontology and Conceptual Modeling Research Group (NEMO) based at the Federal University of Espírito Santo in Brazil. NEMO focuses on developing foundational theories and applying them to complex information systems. The Semantics, Cybersecurity and Services (SCS) group at the University of Twente in the Netherlands employs UFO to address enterprise modeling and the alignment of business and IT systems. Additionally, various interdisciplinary groups, such as those within bioinformatics and healthcare informatics, leverage UFO to develop domain ontologies for more precise data representation and reasoning. These collaborative efforts underscore UFO's prominence in the field of conceptual modeling and ontology engineering.

== Ontology Usage and Community Impact ==
Over the years, UFO has found extensive use in the development of core and domain ontologies across a multitude of domains, in both academic and practical contexts. Its application spans from natural sciences like agriculture and bioinformatics to purely informational domains like telecommunications and game design, as well as practical environmental management problems such as land covering and waste management simulations. Moreover, UFO has been instrumental in analyzing, reengineering, or integrating many modeling languages and standards in different domains.

Since its inception in the early 2000s, UFO has evolved to address the growing complexities and requirements of conceptual modeling. Its influence extends beyond the academic realm, impacting practical applications in various industries. UFO's comprehensive approach to modeling entities, their properties, and interrelations has made it a foundational framework in ontology engineering, influencing the development of other ontologies and modeling languages.

One of the most influential applications of UFO has been in the design of the conceptual modeling language OntoUML and its ecosystem of methodological and computational tools. Studies highlight UFO as a rapidly adopted foundational ontology in conceptual modeling, with OntoUML being among the most used languages in ontology-driven conceptual modeling. Empirical evidence suggests that OntoUML significantly contributes to improving the quality of conceptual models without necessitating additional effort in their production.

The development of UFO-based models through OntoUML is currently facilitated by a microservice-based infrastructure known as OntoUML as a Service (OaaS). This infrastructure decouples model services developed by OntoUML researchers from the modeling tools they support, allowing for independent development and later integration into modeling tools like UML CASE tools.

Besides OntoUML, UFO has also been employed in the design of numerous ontologies in various sub-domains in Software Engineering, forming the Software Engineering Ontology Network (SEON), which addresses problems like application integration, semantic annotation of requirements, software quality assurance, and code interoperability among others.

Furthermore, UFO has made a noticeable impact in domains dealing with legal, social, and economic aspects, including financial accounting, legal relations, and contracts, as well as microeconomic sub-domains. Its robust theory of relations has found to be particularly useful in these domains, catering to the sophisticated modeling of relational aspects required therein. While UFO's role in the development of OntoUML and its application in various domains is notable, discussions continue regarding the extent of its practical impact and adoption in non-academic settings.

The Unified Foundational Ontology (UFO) has been notably discussed in the "Foundational Ontologies in Action" issue of Applied Ontology, highlighting its practical applications and challenges. This discussion is part of the FOUST project, which aims to bridge gaps in applied ontology by bringing together designers of major foundational ontologies, including UFO. The project focuses on concrete use-cases, emphasizing the need for consistent modeling methodologies and the importance of understanding different logical languages and formal consistency in ontological systems. This structured approach underlines UFO's effectiveness in diverse domains, particularly in modeling object properties, social situations, and the representation of artifacts and their components

== Criticism ==
Despite UFO's influence in research and ontology development, its theoretical density and complexity have been identified as barriers to its wider adoption and practical application. Critics have pointed out that UFO, like other ontological frameworks, may suffer from issues of complexity and abstractness that can hinder its practical application. Some argue that the rich theoretical underpinnings, while academically rigorous, can make it difficult for practitioners to adopt without extensive training. This complexity can lead to challenges in implementation, particularly in interdisciplinary projects where stakeholders may not have a background in formal ontology.

The Unified Foundational Ontology's ambitious scope and depth, while contributing significantly to academic discourse, have led to criticisms regarding its abstract nature and the challenges it poses for practical application, particularly in interdisciplinary projects. It stands as a significant academic contribution to conceptual modeling, yet it continues to navigate the challenges of balancing theoretical rigor with practical usability in diverse domains.

== See also ==
- Formal ontology
- ISO/IEC 21838
- Ontology engineering
- Upper ontology
- Basic Formal Ontology
