= Bizzdesign =

Dutch enterprise architecture software firm

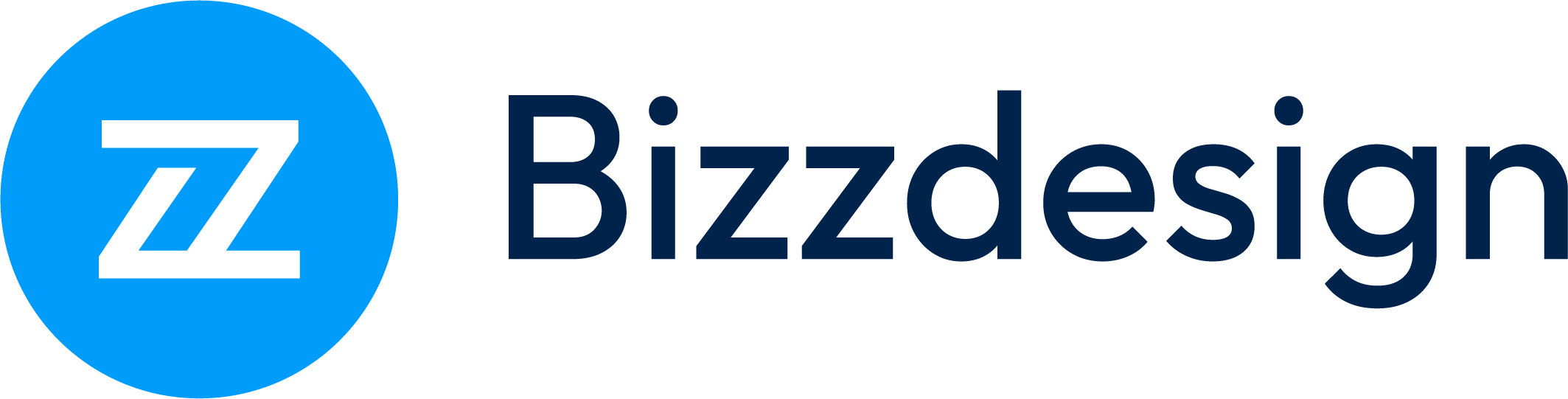
- Type: Private
- Industry: Enterprise architecture, Business process management, Business Architecture, Security Architecture, Application Portfolio Management
- Founded: 2000
- Headquarters: Enschede, Netherlands
- Area served: EMEA, Americas, APAC
- Key people: Henry Franken, Harmen van den Berg, Harm Bakker (founders)
- Products: Bizzdesign Horizzon Platform
- Parent: Main Capital Partners

Bizzdesign (also stylized BiZZDesign) is a Dutch SaaS company which specializes in Enterprise Architecture and Business process management (BPM) platforms designed to support architects and executives in aligning business goals, processes and technology and designing business transformations.

It was founded in 2000 by Henry Franken, Harmen van den Berg and Harm Bakker. The company is notable for its involvement in the co-development of ArchiMate, a widely used enterprise architecture modeling language, and for creating Bizzdesign Enterprise Studio.

== History ==
Bizzdesign started as spin-off from a research project (1996–2001) to develop a test environment for business processes, originated by the Telematica Instituut (now Novay) in cooperation with partners such as the IBM, the Dutch Pension Fund APG, Tax and Customs Administration, and the ING Group.

In 2016 the company presented the new variation of the software called Bizzdesign Enterprise studio.

In 2022, Bizzdesign was acquired by private equity investor Main Capital Partners.

In 2024 and 2025, Bizzdesign acquired enterprise-architecture software companies MEGA International and Alfabet.

== Awards and recognition ==
Bizzdesign is listed in top 10 of Enterprise Architecture tools according to different reports.

== See also ==
- ArchiMate
