= Sewell Chan =

American journalist

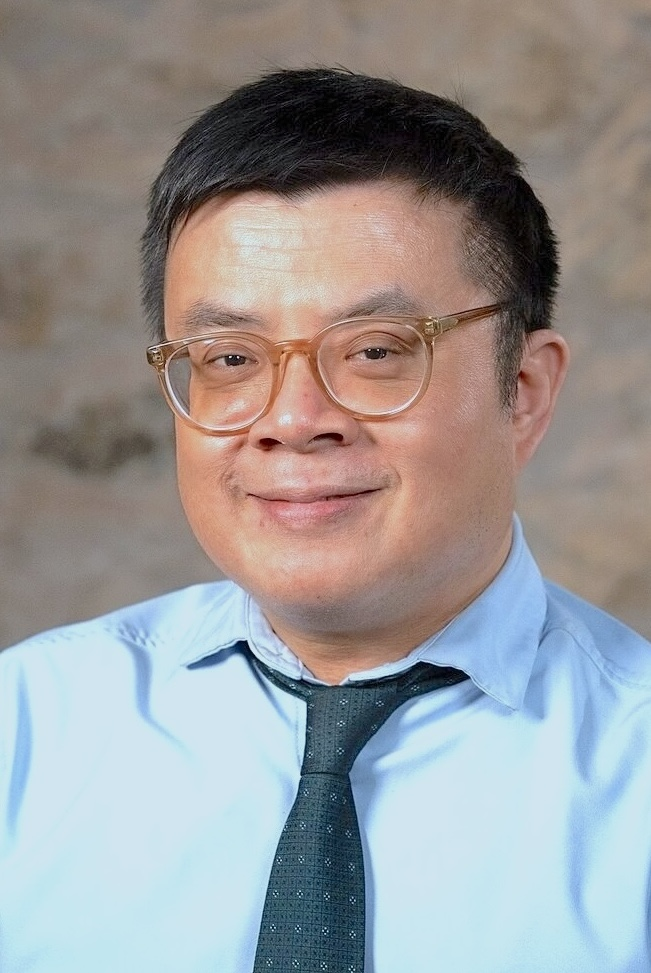
- Chan (SXSW 2025)
- Born: August 29, 1977 (age 48); Manhattan, New York City, U.S.
- Education: Harvard University (BA); Oxford University (MPhil)
- Notable credit(s): Los Angeles Times (2018–2021); The New York Times (2004–2018); The Washington Post (2000–2004)

Sewell Chan is an American journalist and media commentator. He is a senior fellow at the Annenberg Center on Communication Leadership & Policy, focusing on press freedom.

In 2025, Chan was fired from his role as the executive editor of the Columbia Journalism Review after complaints about mistreatment of staff, which Chan denied. Previously, he was the editor-in-chief of The Texas Tribune from 2021 to 2024. Prior to that, Chan held positions at the Los Angeles Times from 2018 to 2021, The New York Times from 2004 to 2018, and The Washington Post from 2000 to 2004.

== Early life and education ==
Chan, the son of immigrants from China and Hong Kong, grew up in Flushing, Queens and attended New York City public schools and Hunter College High School, where he was the co-editor of the school's independent newspaper, The Observer. He graduated from Harvard University with an AB in Social Studies in 1998 and received a Marshall Scholarship for graduate study at Oxford University. He received his MPhil in politics from Oxford in 2000.

== Career ==
From 2000 to 2004, Chan wrote for The Washington Post, where he covered municipal politics, poverty and social services, and education. Chan's tenure also included a stint as a correspondent at the Post's bureau in Baghdad, where he reportedly clashed with his colleagues, including an incident in which Chan allegedly asked that the Iraqi driver for the bureau personally install a new toilet seat in Chan's hotel room at the Sheraton. The posting in Baghdad lasted only three months.

Chan moved to The New York Times in 2004. In January 2010, Chan joined The Times's Washington bureau as a correspondent covering economic policy. In February 2011, Chan was named a deputy editor of the Times Op-Ed page and Sunday Review section. From 2015 to 2018, Chan was an International News Editor.

In August 2018, the Los Angeles Times named Chan a deputy managing editor. In April 2020, he became an editorial page editor. Chan was the lead author of a 2020 editorial examining the Los Angeles Times' fraught history with communities of color and journalists of color and apologizing for the newspaper's history of racism. After Donald Trump lost the 2020 election, Chan faced criticism for publishing a full page of letters devoted to Californians who had voted for Trump.

Chan was named The Texas Tribune editor-in-chief effective October 2021. Chan served as a judge for the American Mosaic Journalism Prize in 2024 and 2025.

In April 2025, Chan was named a senior fellow at the Annenberg Center on Communication Leadership & Policy, with a concentration on global press freedom.

=== Workplace misconduct allegations ===
Chan became the executive editor of the Columbia Journalism Review in September 2024. In April 2025, Columbia University fired Chan from CJR, after a series of complaints about his leadership and treatment of staff from "roughly 10 people [that] aired concerns about Mr. Chan’s behavior, describing insults, threats to ruin their reputations, and an atmosphere of fear and hostility". Chan denied the allegations, while admitting to "pointed conversations" with staff.

== See also ==
- Chinese people in the New York metropolitan area
- LGBT culture in New York City
- List of LGBT people from New York City
- New Yorkers in journalism
