= Giancarlo Guizzardi =

Brazilian–Italian computer scientist

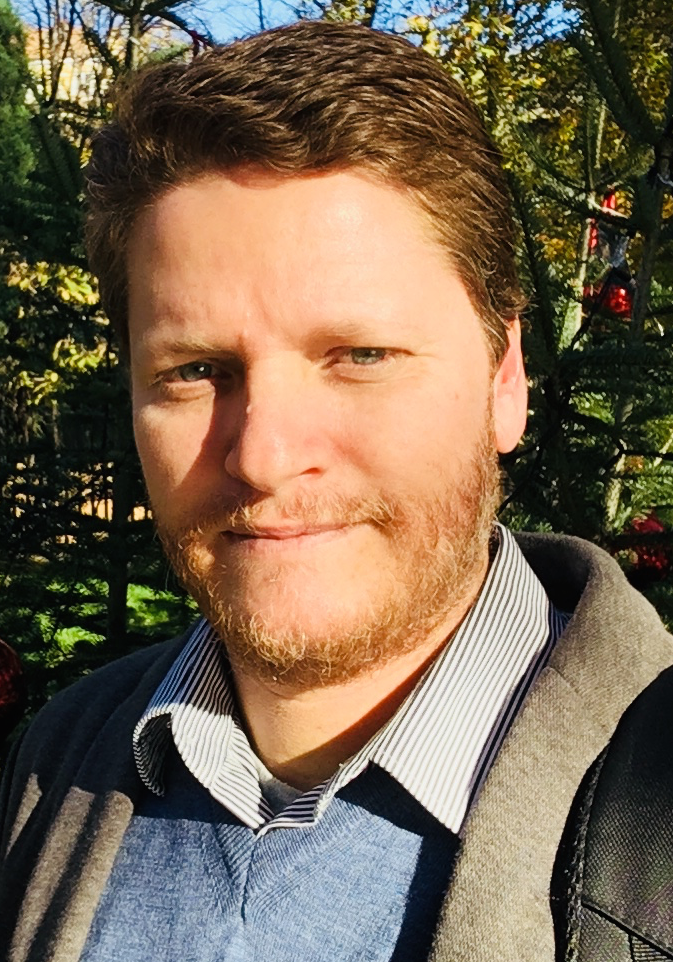
- Born: 22 April 1975 (age 51); Vitória, Espírito Santo, Brazil
- Citizenship: Brazilian, Italian
- Education: University of Twente
- Known for: Conceptual Modeling, Ontology, OntoUML
- Awards: ER Fellow 2023
- Scientific career
- Fields: Computer science
- Workplaces: University of Twente; Semantics, Cybersecurity & Services
- Thesis: Ontological foundations for structural conceptual models
- Doctoral advisor: Chris Vissers, Luís Ferreira Pires, Marten van Sinderen
- Doctoral students: Tiago Prince Sales, Claudenir Morais Fonseca, Ítalo Oliveira, Cristine Griffo, Maria das Graças da Silva Teixeira, Glenda Amaral, Victorio Albani Carvalho, Xiaowei Wang, Guylerme Figueiredo, João Rafael Nicola, Bruno Borlini, Elena Romanenko, Isadora Vale Sousa, Rodrigo Calhau
- Website: people.utwente.nl

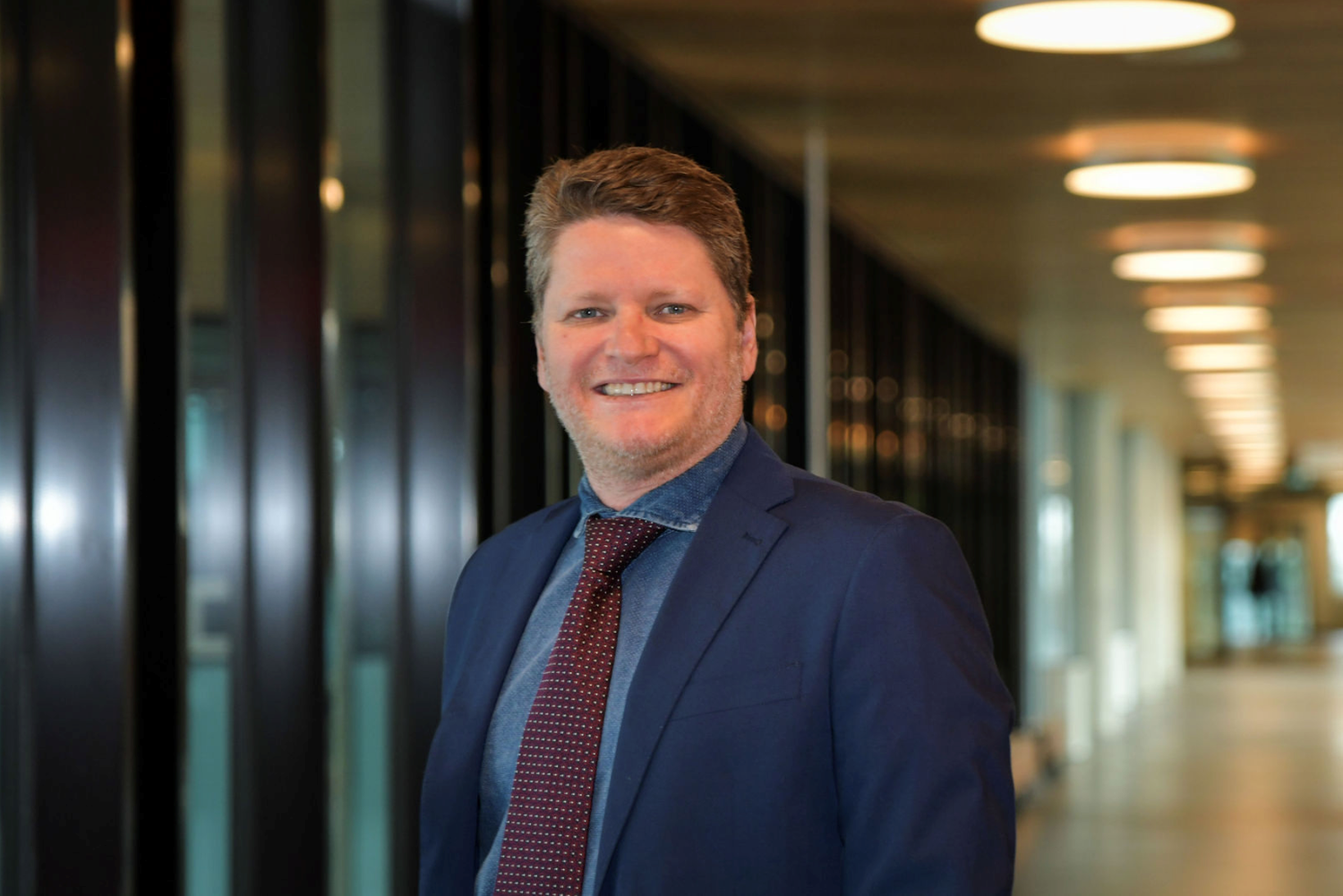
Giancarlo Guizzardi

Giancarlo Guizzardi (born 22 April 1975 in Vitoria, Brazil) is a Brazilian–Italian computer scientist specializing in conceptual modeling, enterprise modeling, applied ontology and ontology-driven information systems. He is a professor at the University of Twente, in The Netherlands, and a senior researcher and founding member of the Ontology & Conceptual Modeling Research Group (NEMO) in Vitoria, Brazil.

== Work ==
He is a strong advocate of an approach to Conceptual Modeling known as Ontology-Driven Conceptual Modeling (ODCM). ODCM proposes that, since Conceptual Modeling is about representing conceptualizations of reality to support human understanding communication and problem-solving, it must rely on foundations that take formal ontology in philosophy, cognitive science, philosophical logics and linguistic seriously.

He defended his PhD thesis in 2005 in the University of Twente (with the highest distinction). His thesis, entitled Ontological Foundations for Structural Conceptual Models, lays the foundation of what came to be known as the Unified Foundational Ontology and the OntoUML language.
