= Kennispark Twente =

- Location: Enschede, Netherlands
- No. of tenants: 400+
- No. of workers: 5000+
- Size: 1.28 km^{2} (0.49 sq mi)
- Website: www.kennispark.nl

Kennispark Twente (English: Knowledge Park Twente) is a business park in the city of Enschede, Netherlands, adjacent to the public research university, University of Twente.

The primary goal of Kennispark Twente is supporting startups, industrial companies and creating a business climate for high tech businesses. The Kennispark Twente ecosystem comprises more than 400 companies and institutions, employing over 5000 innovation workers and entrepreneurs.

In March 2017, the support program was renamed to Novel-T for a better distinction between the organization and the campus.

== Companies ==
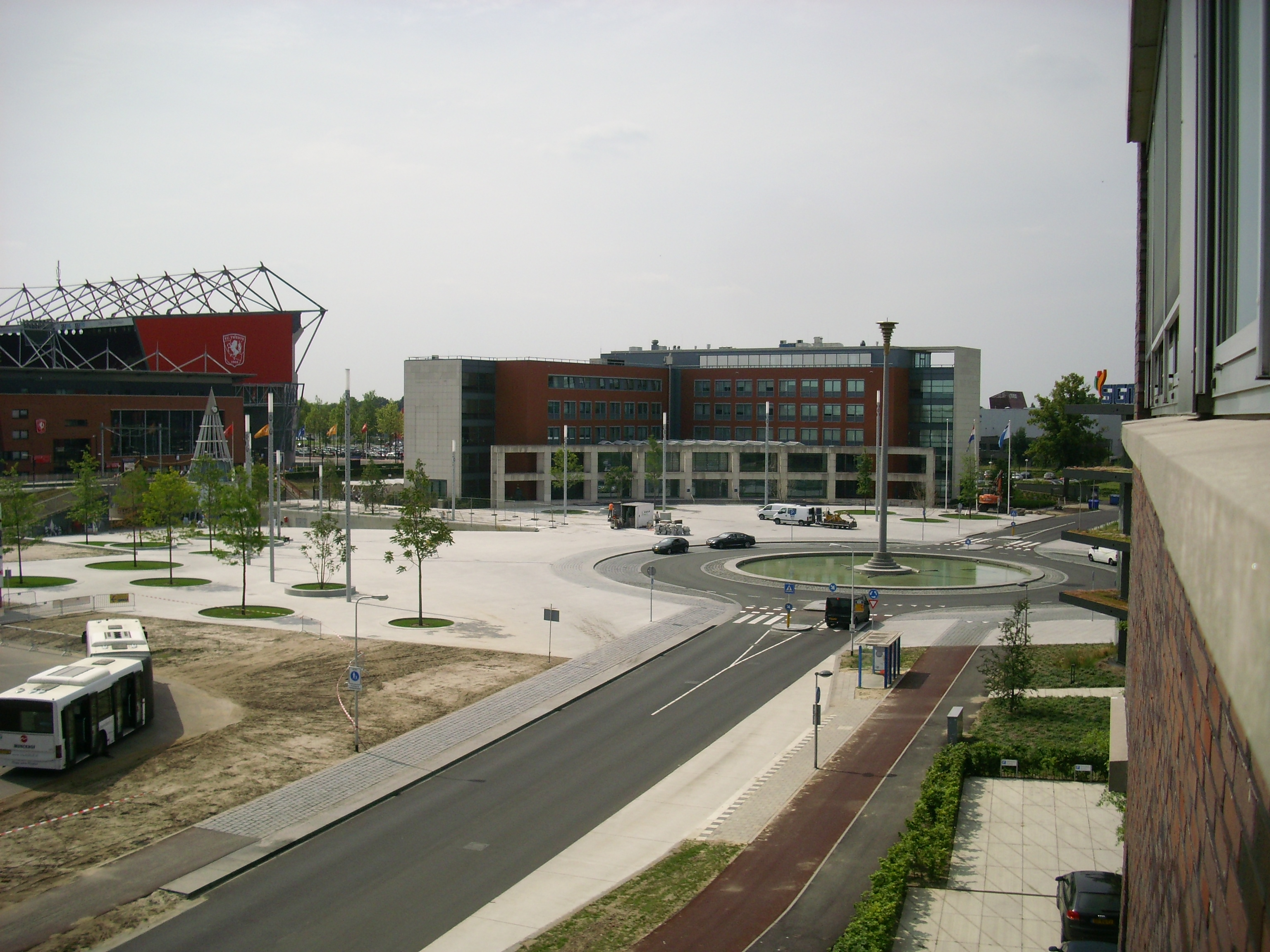
Kennispark Enschede Railway Station

The following companies and spin-offs were founded in the Kennispark:

- Takeaway.com
- Booking.com
- SciSports
- Xsens
