= Cees Links =

Dutch entrepreneur

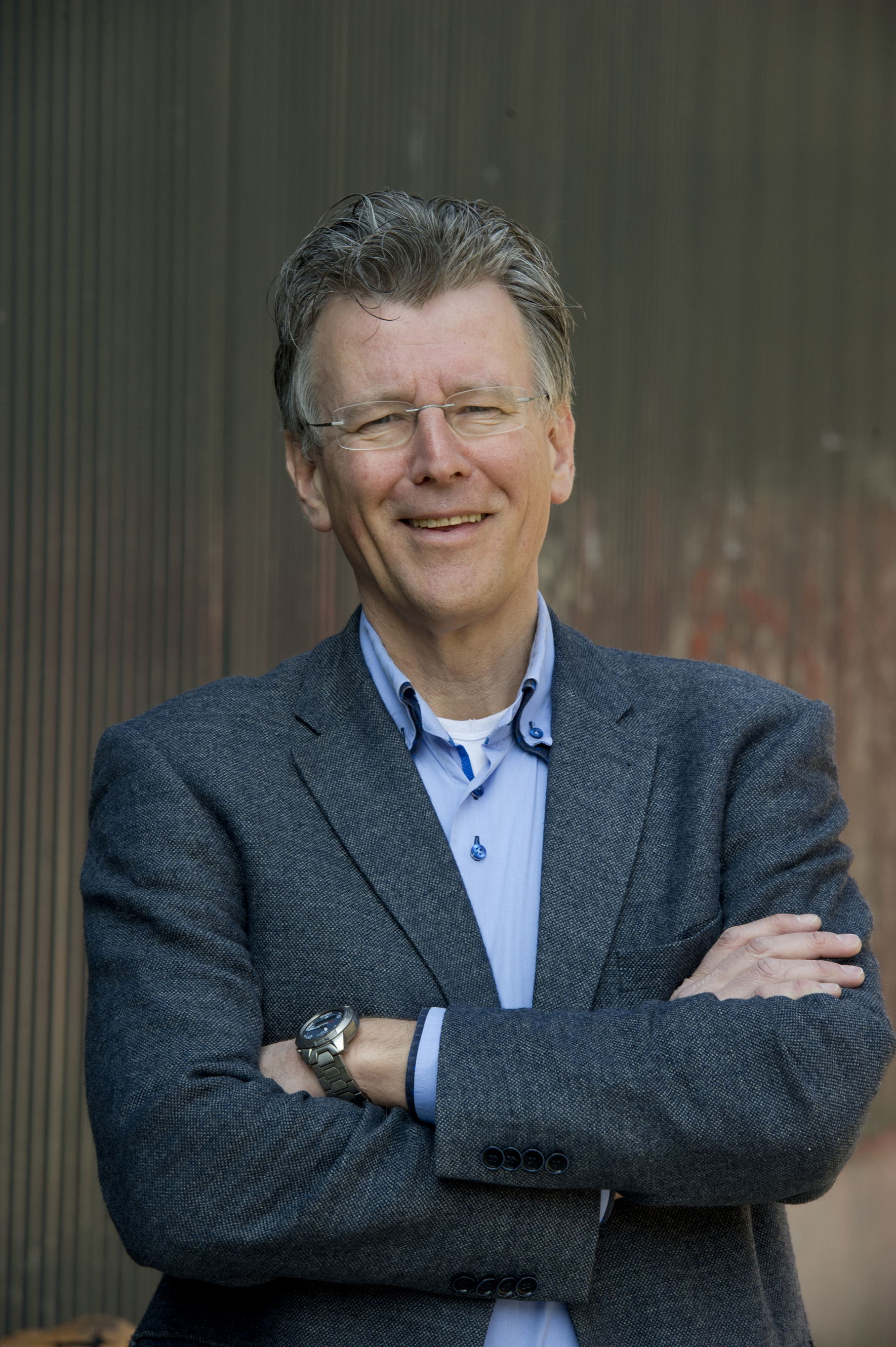
- Born: 1957 (age 68–69); Amsterdam, the Netherlands
- Citizenship: Dutch
- Education: University of Twente
- Occupations: Entrepreneur, Electric engineer
- Known for: Building WaveLAN

Cees Links (born in 1957 in Amsterdam, the Netherlands) is a Dutch entrepreneur and electric engineer.. He was the founder and former CEO of GreenPeak Technologies (2004), a fabless semiconductor company for Smart Home and Internet of things (IoT) applications, which was sold to Qorvo Inc., a USA-based semi-conductor/technology company in 2016.

Links was part of the NCR Corporation group in Nieuwegein that built WaveLAN, a wireless local area network that made way for the current Wi-Fi technology.

In 2024, Links served as the CEO of SuperLight Photonics, known today as "Integrated Laser Photonics".

== Education ==
Links graduated from University of Twente in 1975 with a bachelor's degree in electrical engineering. He later earned a master's degree in applied mathematics from the same university in 1982.

== Career ==
Upon graduation from the University of Twente in 1982, Links started his career at NCR Corporation. As product manager, he would have worked on the first concept development and launch of the world's first wireless LAN product in 1990, WaveLAN, a major innovation at that time. Throughout several acquisitions and divestitures (NCR, AT&T, Lucent Technologies and Agere Systems), Links continued his work in the wireless LAN area, which he turned into a multi-hundred million dollar business for Agere Systems. Links became general manager in 1996 of the business unit. He directly closed the deal with Steve Jobs at Apple Computer in 1999 that ignited the growth of the wireless LAN industry.

== Awards ==
Links was recognized in January 2017 as Wi-Fi pioneer with the Golden Mousetrap Lifetime Achievement award.

In May 2019, Links was inducted into Wi-Fi NOW Hall of Fame.
