= Nicolai Petkov =

Dutch computer scientist

Nicolai Petkov is computer scientist and professor emeritus of Intelligent Systems and Computer Science at the University of Groningen, known for his contributions in the fields of brain-inspired computing, pattern recognition, machine learning, and parallel computing.

== Life and work ==
Nicolai Petkov was appointed Professor of Computer Science (chair of Parallel Computing, later Intelligent Systems and Parallel Computing) at the University of Groningen in 1991. He was PhD thesis advisor/director/supervisor (promotor in Dutch) of more than forty PhD graduates. At the University of Groningen he was head of the divisions High Performance Computing and Imaging, and Intelligent Systems (1991-2000, resp. 2000-2023), head of the Center for High Performance Computing (1993-1999), head of the Department of Computer Science (1997-1999), and scientific director of the Institute for Mathematics and Computer Science (now Johann Bernoulli Institute), 1998-2009. He was also member of the University Council (2011-2023) in which he was chairman of the Science Faction (2013-2023). As of 2023 he is professor emeritus of the University of Groningen.

Nicolai Petkov was/is associate editor of several scientific journals (e.g. Parallel Computing, J. Image and Vision Computing, etc.). He co-organized and co-chaired several editions of the International Conference on Computer Analysis of Images and Patterns CAIP (2003 in Groningen; 2009 in Münster, Germany; 2015 in Valletta, Malta; 2021 online Cyprus), the International Workshops on Brain-Inspired Computing BrainComp in Cetraro, Italy (2013, 2015, 2017, 2019), the International Conferences on Applications of Intelligent Systems APPIS (annually since 2018) and the International Workshops on Advances and Applications of Machine Learning and AI AMALEA (annually since 2022).

Nicolai Petkov's initial research in the 1980s and early 1990s was in the field of systolic parallel algorithms. After that he worked mainly on brain-inspired computing. In this area he considers as most valuable his and his students' work on the computational modeling of non-classical receptive field inhibition (also known as surround suppression) in neural cells in the visual cortex. This pioneering work provided explanation of various visual perception effects, such as the masking effect of texture on the perception of object contours and the orientation-contrast pop-out. It led to the development of more effective computer vision algorithms for various industrial, medical and other applications. His further work was/is for the development of pattern recognition and machine learning algorithms for various types of data: image, video, audio, and time series with applications in robotics, manufacturing, agricultural industry, medicine, finance, etc.

== Selected publications ==
Nicolai Petkov is author and editor of several books and many other scientific publications.

Articles (selection):

- HH Htun, M Biehl, N Petkov: Forecasting relative returns for S&P 500 stocks using machine learning. Financial Innovation 10 (1), 118, 2024
- HH Htun, M Biehl, N Petkov: Survey of feature selection and extraction techniques for stock market prediction. Financial Innovation 9 (1), 26, 2023
- G Azzopardi, N Strisciuglio, M Vento, N Petkov: Trainable COSFIRE filters for vessel delineation with application to retinal images. Medical Image Analysis 19 (1), 2015, 46-57
- I Giotis, N Molders, S Land, M Biehl, MF Jonkman, N Petkov: MED-NODE: A computer-assisted melanoma diagnosis system using non-dermoscopic images. Expert Systems with Applications 42 (19), 2015, 6578-6585
- P Foggia, N Petkov, A Saggese, N Strisciuglio, M Vento: Audio surveillance of roads: A system for detecting anomalous sounds. IEEE Transactions on Intelligent Transportation Systems 17 (1), 2015, 279-288
- P Foggia, N Petkov, A Saggese, N Strisciuglio, M Vento: Reliable detection of audio events in highly noisy environments. Pattern Recognition Letters 65, 2015, 22-28
- G Azzopardi, N Petkov: Automatic detection of vascular bifurcations in segmented retinal images using trainable COSFIRE filters. Pattern Recognition Letters 34 (8), 2013, 922-933
- G Azzopardi, N Petkov: Trainable COSFIRE filters for keypoint detection and pattern recognition. IEEE Transactions on Pattern Analysis and Machine Intelligence, 35 (2), 2012, 490–503.
- G Azzopardi, N Petkov: A CORF computational model of a simple cell that relies on LGN input outperforms the Gabor function model. Biological Cybernetics 106, 2012, 177-189
- G Papari and N Petkov. Edge and line oriented contour detection: State of the art. Image and Vision Computing, 29 (2-3), 2011, 79-103.
- N Petkov, E Subramanian: Motion detection, noise reduction, texture suppression, and contour enhancement by spatiotemporal Gabor filters with surround inhibition. Biological Cybernetics 97 (5-6), 2007, 423-439
- G Papari, N Petkov, P Campisi: Artistic edge and corner enhancing smoothing. IEEE Transactions on Image Processing 16 (10), 2007, 2449-2462
- A Ghosh, N Petkov: Robustness of shape descriptors to incomplete contour representations. IEEE Transactions on Pattern Analysis and Machine Intelligence 27 (11), 2005, 1793 -1804
- C Grigorescu, N Petkov, MA Westenberg: Contour and boundary detection improved by surround suppression of texture edges. Image and Vision Computing 22 (8), 2004, 609-622
- C Grigorescu, N Petkov, and MA Westenberg. Contour detection based on nonclassical receptive field inhibition. IEEE Transactions on Image Processing, 12 (7), 2003, 729-739.
- C Grigorescu, N Petkov: Distance sets for shape filters and shape recognition. IEEE Transactions on Image Processing 12 (10), 2003, 1274-1286
- N Petkov, MA Westenberg: Suppression of contour perception by band-limited noise and its relation to nonclassical receptive field inhibition. Biological Cybernetics 88 (3), 2003, 236-246
- SE Grigorescu, N Petkov, and P Kruizinga. Comparison of texture features based on Gabor filters. IEEE Transactions on Image Processing, 11 (10), 2002, 1160-1167.
- P Kruizinga and N Petkov: Non-linear operator for oriented texture. IEEE Transactions on Image Processing 8 (10), 1999, 1395-1407
- N Petkov and P Kruizinga: Computational models of visual neurons specialised in the detection of periodic and aperiodic oriented visual stimuli: bar and grating cells, Biological Cybernetics, 76 (2), 1997, 83-96.
- N Petkov: Biologically motivated computationally intensive approaches to image pattern recognition. Future Generation Computer Systems 11, 1995, 451-465

Books (selection):

- N Petkov: Systolic Parallel Processing. Amsterdam: North-Holland, Elsevier Sci. Publ., 1993.

Edited books:

- N Petkov, N Strisciuglio, CM Travieso-González (Eds.): APPIS 2020: Proceedings of the 3rd International Conference on Applications of Intelligent Systems. Las Palmas de Gran Canaria, Spain, January 2020, ACM.
- N Petkov, N Strisciuglio, CM Travieso-González (Eds.): APPIS 2019: Proceedings of the 2nd International Conference on Applications of Intelligent Systems. Las Palmas de Gran Canaria, Spain, January 2019, ACM.
- K Amunts, L Grandinetti, T Lippert, N Petkov (Eds.): Brain-Inspired Computing: 4th International Workshop, BrainComp 2019, Cetraro, Italy, July 2019, Revised Selected Papers, LNCS 12339, 2021, Springer.
- K Amunts, L Grandinetti, T Lippert, N Petkov (Eds.): Brain-Inspired Computing: Second International Workshop, BrainComp 2015, Cetraro, Italy, July 2015, Revised Selected Papers, LNCS 10087, 2016, Springer.
- G Azzopardi and N Petkov (Eds.). Computer Analysis of Images and Patterns: 16th International Conference, CAIP 2015, Valletta, Malta, September 2015, Proceedings. Parts I and II, LNCS 9256 and 9257, Springer.
- L Grandinetti, TA Lippert and N Petkov (Eds.). Brain-Inspired Computing: First International Workshop, BrainComp 2013, Cetraro, Italy, July 2013, Revised Selected Papers), LNCS 8603, Springer.
- X Jiang, N Petkov (Eds.). Computer Analysis of Images and Patterns: 13th International Conference, CAIP 2009, Münster, Germany, September 2009, Proceedings. LNCS 5702, Springer.
- N Petkov, and MA Westenberg (Eds.). Computer Analysis of Images and Patterns: 10th International Conference, CAIP 2003, Groningen, The Netherlands, August 2003, Proceedings. LNCS 2756, Springer.
