= Capability-oriented strategic modelling =

A capability is an ability that an organization, person, or system possesses. Capabilities are typically expressed in general and high-level terms and typically require a combination of organization, people, processes, and technology to achieve. For example, marketing, customer contact, and outbound telemarketing are examples of capabilities.

== See also ==
- Capability management in business
- Enterprise architecture
