= Robert Winter =

Robert Winter may refer to:

- Bob Winter (born 1937), Scottish politician
- Robert Winter (historian) (1924–2019), American architecture historian
- Robert Winter (business theorist) (born c. 1960), German business theorist
- Robert Wintour (1568–1606), English gunpowder plot member
- Robert Winter Fraser (1848–1906), from the Fraser family of artists
