= Novay =

Dutch research institute

- Founded: 1997
- Dissolved: 2014-04-03
- Type: Professional Organization
- Purpose: Telematica
- Region served: European
- Method: Certification, Industry standards, Conferences, Publications
- Key people: Dr. Hermen J. van der Lugt (CEO 2007)
- Revenue: 20 MEURO (budget 2007)
- Employees: 75-100 employees
- Website: www.novay.nl
- Formerly called: Telematica Instituut

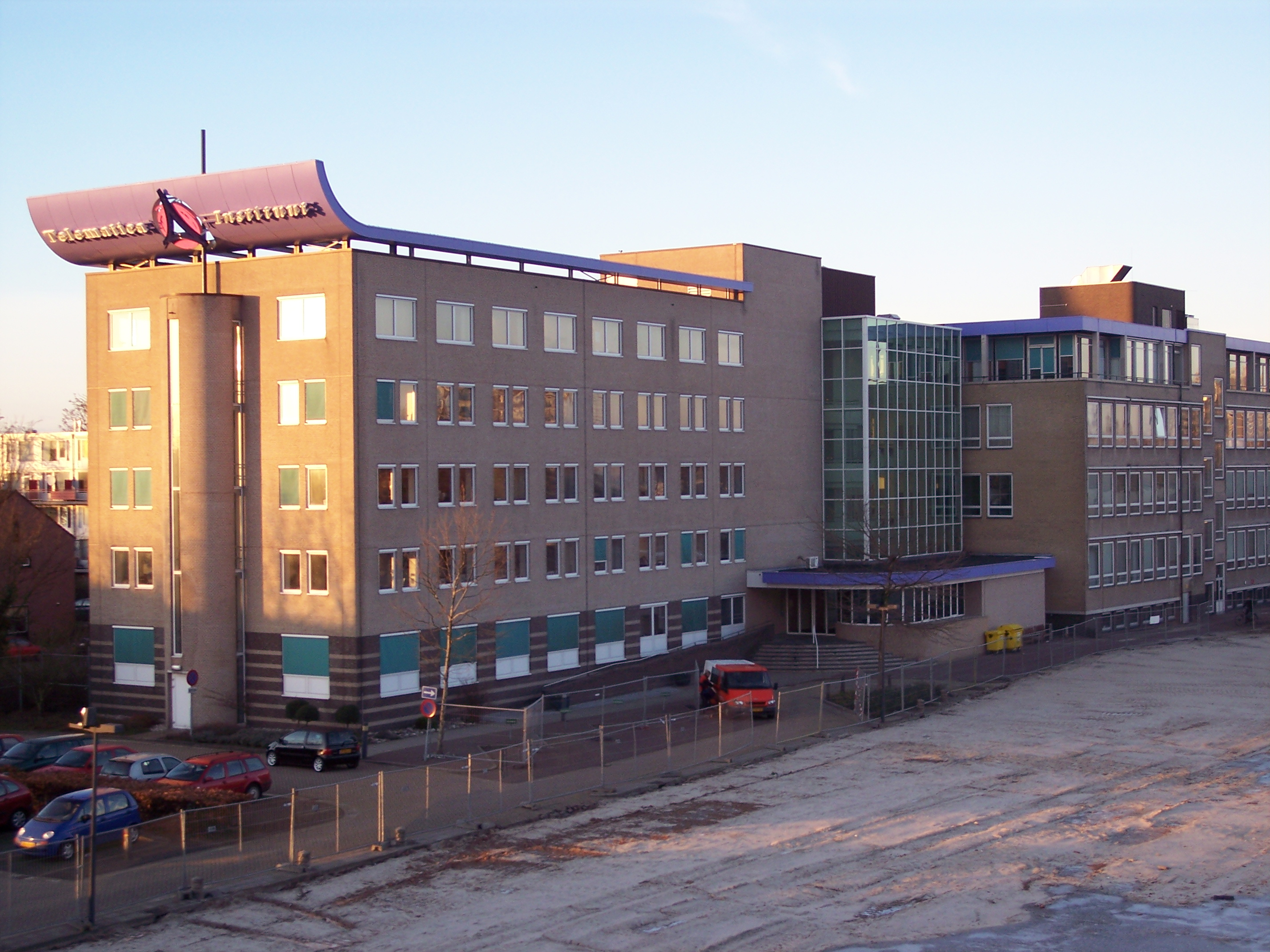
Office building of Novay institute among others, Enschede, Netherlands.

Novay, formally known as the Telematica Instituut was a Dutch research institute in the field of information technology, founded in 1997, known for its development of ArchiMate. In 2009 the Telematica Instituut was reorganized and operated under the new name Novay. It filed for bankruptcy April 3, 2014, and is dissolved.

== Overview ==
Novay was a public-private partnership of knowledge institutes and companies with the objective of increasing the competitive power and innovative capability of the Dutch business community. It is managed and funded by top companies and the government. It aims to translate fundamental knowledge into market-oriented research for the public and private sectors in the field of telematics: multimedia, electronic commerce, mobile communications, CSCW, knowledge management, etc.

The work of Novay focused on total solutions that can be applied directly in businesses and society at large. It gathers insights from a wide range of subject areas, such as information technology, business economics, organisational science, psychology and sociology. These insights are developed further in multidisciplinary teams and forged into new concepts, products and services in the area of information and communication technology.

== Research and development ==
Notable Telematica Instituut/Novay research projects have focussed on:

- Testbed, an architecture of business processes: a software tool and supporting resources for analysing, designing, simulating and introducing business processes. The tool provides information on the consequences of changes in business processes in areas such as service levels, production time and costs, workflow and automation, even before the actual processes have been introduced. In addition, the graphical interface makes the processes understandable for non-specialists.
- Friends, Customised Internet services: This project delivered a component-based middleware platform for the development, rollout and use of all kinds of Internet services.
- ArchiMate : An open and independent modelling language for enterprise architecture, supported by different tool vendors and consulting firms. It provides instruments to support enterprise architects in describing, analyzing and visualizing the relationships among business domains in an unambiguous way. ArchiMate is one of the open standards hosted by the Open Group and based on the IEEE 1471 standard. The ArchiMate framework was developed by the Telematica Instituut to offer companies a simple and intuitive concept that reconciles both IT and business aspects. The standard is constantly being enhanced through the work of an international forum, the ArchiMate forum.

== See also ==
- European Research Center for Information Systems
- IYOUIT
- Maeslantkering
- MobileHCI
- Personal knowledge management
