= Federal enterprise architecture =

Reference enterprise architecture of a federal government

A federal enterprise architecture framework (FEAF) is the U.S. reference enterprise architecture of a federal government. It provides a common approach for the integration of strategic, business and technology management as part of organization design and performance improvement.

The most familiar federal enterprise architecture is the enterprise architecture of the Federal government of the United States, the U.S. "Federal Enterprise Architecture" (FEA) and the corresponding U.S. "Federal Enterprise Architecture Framework" (FEAF). This lemma will focus on this particular enterprise architecture and enterprise architecture framework.

== Overview ==
Enterprise architecture (EA) is a management best practice for aligning business and technology resources to achieve strategic outcomes, improve organizational performance and guide federal agencies to better execute their core missions. An EA describes the current and future state of the agency, and lays out a plan for transitioning from the current state to the desired future state. A federal enterprise architecture is a work in progress to achieve these goals.

The U.S. Federal Enterprise Architecture (FEA) is an initiative of the U.S. Office of Management and Budget, Office of E-Government and IT, that aims to realize the value of enterprise architecture within the U.S. Federal Government. Enterprise Architecture became a recognized strategic and management best practice in U.S. Federal Government with the passage of the Clinger-Cohen Act in 1996.

There are numerous benefits that accrue from implementing and using an enterprise architecture within the U.S. Federal Government. Among them is to provide a common approach for IT acquisition in the United States federal government. It is also designed to ease sharing of information and resources across federal agencies, reduce costs, and improve citizen services.

== History ==
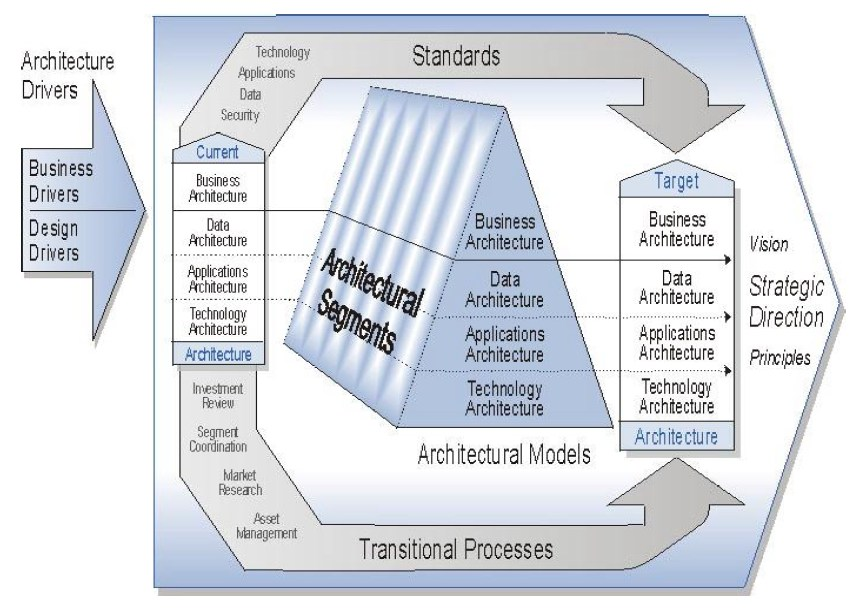
Structure of the U.S. "Federal Enterprise Architecture Framework" (FEAF) Components, presented in 2001.

In September 1999, the Federal CIO Council published the "Federal Enterprise Architecture Framework" (FEAF) Version 1.1 for developing an Enterprise Architecture (EA) within any Federal Agency for a system that transcends multiple inter-agency boundaries. It builds on common business practices and designs that cross organizational boundaries, among others the NIST Enterprise Architecture Model. The FEAF provides an enduring standard for developing and documenting architecture descriptions of high-priority areas. It provides guidance in describing architectures for multi-organizational functional segments of the Federal Government. At the time of release, the Government's IT focus on Y2K issues and then the events of September 2001 diverted attention from EA implementation, though its practice in advance and subsequent to this may have ameliorated the impact of these events. As part of the President's Management Agenda, in August 2001, the E-Government Task Force project was initiated (unofficially called Project Quicksilver). A key finding in that strategy was that the substantial overlap and redundant agency systems constrained the ability to achieve the Bush administration strategy of making the government "citizen centered". The Task Force recommended the creation a Federal Enterprise Architecture Project and the creation of the FEA Office at OMB. This was a shift from the FEAF focus on Information Engineering, to a J2EE object re-use approach using reference models comprising taxonomies that linked performance outcomes to lines of business, process services components, types of data, and technology components. Interim releases since that time have provided successive increases in definition for the core reference models (see below), as well as a very robust methodology for actually developing an architecture in a series of templates forming the Federal Segment Architecture Methodology (FSAM) and its next generation replacement, the Collaborative Planning Methodology (CPM), which was designed to be more flexible, more widely applicable, and more inclusive of the larger set of planning disciplines.

These federal architectural segments collectively constitute the federal enterprise architecture. In 2001, the Federal Architecture Working Group (FAWG) was sponsoring the development of Enterprise Architecture products for trade and grant Federal architecture segments. Methods prescribed way of approaching a particular problem. As shown in the figure, the FEAF partitions a given architecture into business, data, applications, and technology architectures. The FEAF overall framework created at that time (see image) includes the first three columns of the Zachman Framework and the Spewak's Enterprise Architecture Planning methodology.

In May 2012 OMB published a full new guide, the "Common Approach to Federal Enterprise Architecture". Released as part of the federal CIO's policy guidance and management tools for increasing shared approaches to IT service delivery, the guide presents an overall approach to developing and using Enterprise Architecture in the Federal Government. The Common Approach promotes increased levels of mission effectiveness by standardizing the development and use of architectures within and between Federal Agencies. This includes principles for using EA to help agencies eliminate waste and duplication, increase shared services, close performance gaps, and promote engagement among government, industry, and citizens.

On January 29, 2013, the White House released Version 2 of the Federal Enterprise Architecture Framework (FEAF-II), to government agencies, making it public about a year later. The document meets the criteria set forth by Common Approach, emphasizing that strategic goals drive business services, which in turn provide the requirements for enabling technologies. At its core is the Consolidated Reference Model (CRM), which equips OMB and Federal agencies with a common language and framework to describe and analyze investments.

Overall the Federal Enterprise Architecture (FEA) is mandated by a series of federal laws and mandates. These federal laws have been:

- GPRA 1993 : Government Performance and Reform Act
- PRA 1995 : Paperwork Reduction Act
- CCA 1996 : Clinger-Cohen Act
- GPEA 1998 : The Government Paperwork Elimination Act
- FISMA 2002 : Federal Information Security Management Act
- E-Gov 2002 : Electronic Government

Supplementary OMB circulars have been:

- A-11 : Preparation, Submission and Execution of the Budget
- A-130 : OMB Circular A-130 Management of Federal Information Resources, first issued in December 1985

== Collaborative planning methodology ==
The Collaborative Planning Methodology (CPM) is a simple, repeatable process that consists of integrated, multi-disciplinary analysis that results in recommendations formed in collaboration with leaders, stakeholders, planners, and implementers. It is intended as a full planning and implementation lifecycle for use at all levels of scope defined in the Common Approach to Federal Enterprise Architecture: International, National, Federal, Sector, Agency, Segment, System, and Application.

== Version 2 reference models ==
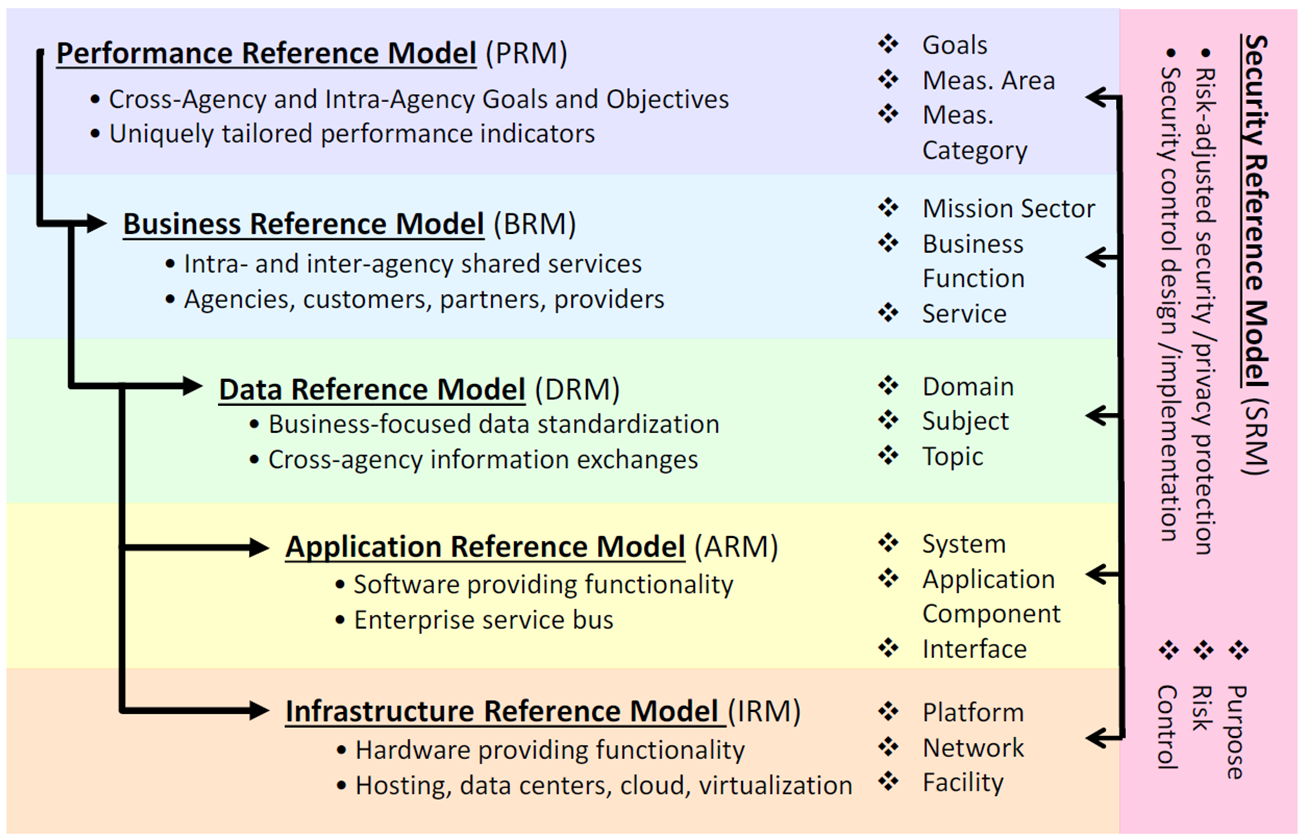
Federal Enterprise Architecture.

The Consolidated Reference Model of the Federal Enterprise Architecture Framework (FEAF) equips OMB and Federal agencies with a common language and framework to describe and analyze investments. It consists of a set of interrelated reference models designed to facilitate cross-agency analysis and the identification of duplicative investments, gaps and opportunities for collaboration within and across agencies. Collectively, the reference models comprise a framework for describing important elements of federal agency operations in a common and consistent way. Through the use of the FEAF and its vocabulary, IT portfolios can be better managed and leveraged across the federal government, enhancing collaboration and ultimately transforming the Federal government.

The five reference models in version 1 (see below) have been regrouped and expanded into six in the FEAF-II.

Performance Reference Model (PRM)
This reference model supports architectural analysis and reporting in the strategy sub-architecture view of the overall EA. The PRM links agency strategy, internal business components, and investments, providing a means to measure the impact of those investments on strategic outcomes.
Business Reference Model (BRM)
This reference model, which combines the Business and Service Component Reference Models from FEAF v1, supports architectural analysis and reporting in the business services sub-architecture view of the overall EA. The BRM describes an organization through a taxonomy of common mission and support service areas instead of through a stove-piped organizational view, thereby promoting intra- and inter-agency collaboration.
Data Reference Model (DRM)
The DRM facilitates discovery of existing data holdings residing in "silos" and enables understanding the meaning of the data, how to access it, and how to leverage it to support performance results.
Application Reference Model (ARM)
The ARM categorizes the system- and application-related standards and technologies that support the delivery of service capabilities, allowing agencies to share and reuse common solutions and benefit from economies of scale.
Infrastructure Reference Model (IRM)
The IRM categorizes the network/cloud related standards and technologies to support and enable the delivery of voice, data, video, and mobile service components and capabilities.
Security Reference Model (SRM)
The SRM provides a common language and methodology for discussing security and privacy in the context of federal agencies' business and performance goals.

== Version 1 reference models ==
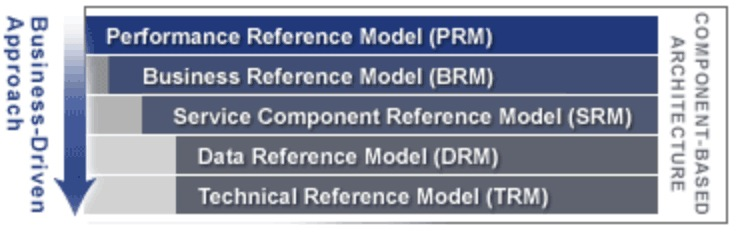
Federal Enterprise Architecture.

The FEA is built using an assortment of reference models that develop a common taxonomy for describing IT resources. FEA Version 1 reference models (see image) included the following:

- performance reference model,
- business reference model,
- service component reference model,
- data reference model and
- technical reference model.

It is designed to ease sharing of information and resources across federal agencies, reduce costs, and improve citizen services. It is an initiative of the US Office of Management and Budget that aims to comply with the Clinger-Cohen Act.

=== Performance Reference Model (PRM) ===
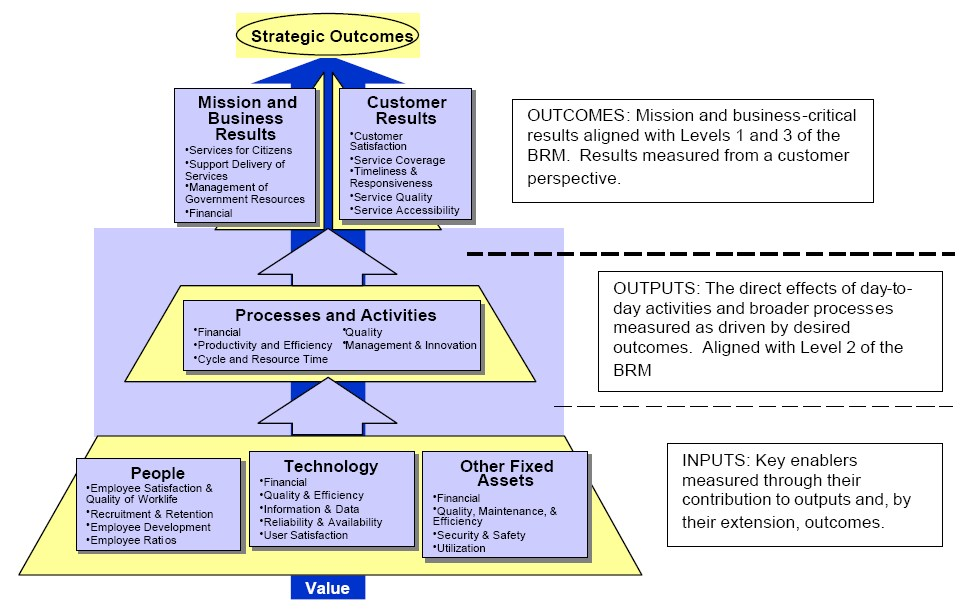
Performance reference model, 2005.

The PRM is a standardized framework to measure the performance of major IT investments and their contribution to program performance. The PRM has three main purposes:

1. Help produce enhanced performance information to improve strategic and daily decision-making;
2. Improve the alignment — and better articulate the contribution of — inputs to outputs and outcomes, thereby creating a clear "line of sight" to desired results;
3. Identify performance improvement opportunities that span traditional organizational structures and boundaries

The PRM uses a number of existing approaches to performance measurement, including the Balanced Scorecard, Baldrige Criteria, value measuring methodology, program logic models, the value chain, and the theory of constraints. In addition, the PRM was informed by what agencies are currently measuring through PART assessments, GPRA, enterprise architecture, and Capital Planning and Investment Control. The PRM is currently composed of four measurement areas:

- Mission and Business Results
- Customer Results
- Processes and Activities
- Technology

=== Business Reference Model (BRM) ===
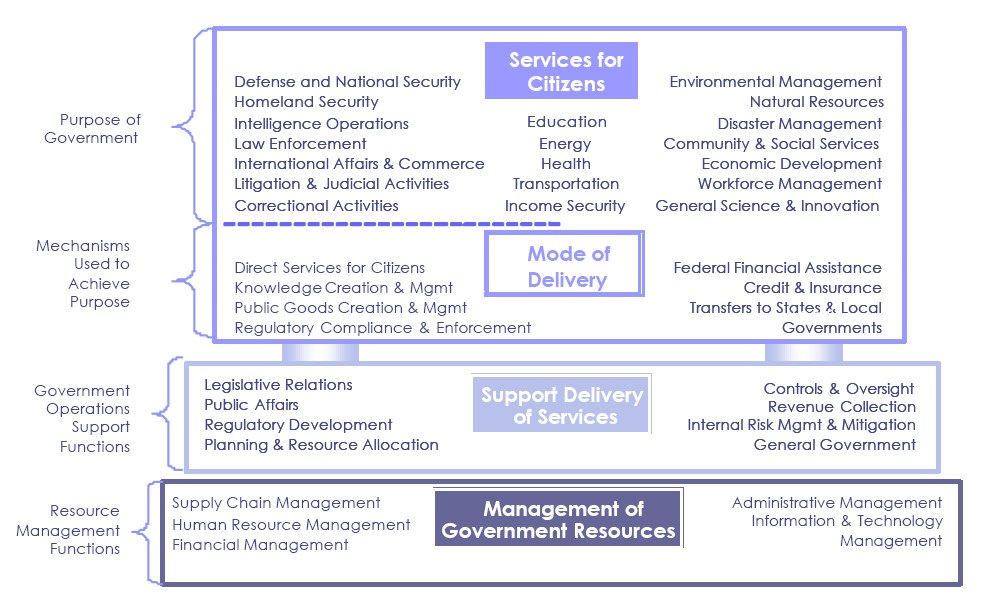
Business Reference Model overview.

The "FEA business reference model" is a function-driven framework for describing the business operations of the Federal Government independent of the agencies that perform them. This business reference model provides an organized, hierarchical construct for describing the day-to-day business operations of the Federal government using a functionally driven approach. The BRM is the first layer of the Federal Enterprise Architecture and it is the main viewpoint for the analysis of data, service components and technology.

The BRM is broken down into four areas:

- Services for Citizens
- Mode of Delivery
- Support Delivery of Services
- Management of Government Resources

The Business Reference Model provides a framework that facilitates a functional (as opposed to organizational) view of the federal government's LoBs, including its internal operations and its services for the citizens, independent of the agencies, bureaus and offices that perform them. By describing the federal government around common business areas instead of by a stovepiped, agency-by-agency view, the BRM promotes agency collaboration and serves as the underlying foundation for the FEA and E-Gov strategies.

While the BRM does provide an improved way of thinking about government operations, it is only a model; its true utility can only be realized when it is effectively used. The functional approach promoted by the BRM will do little to help accomplish the goals of E-Government if it is not incorporated into EA business architectures and the management processes of all Federal agencies and OMB.

=== Service Component Reference Model (SRM) ===
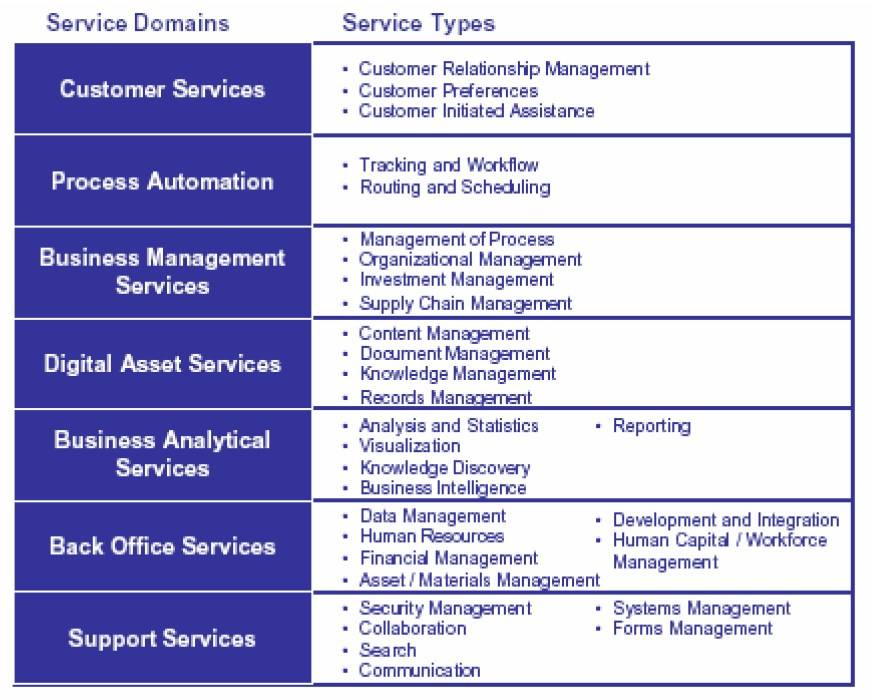
Service Component Reference Model.

The Service Component Reference Model (SRM) is a business and performance-driven, functional framework that classifies Service Components with respect to how they support business and/or performance objectives. The SRM is intended for use to support the discovery of government-wide business and application Service Components in IT investments and assets. The SRM is structured across horizontal and vertical service domains that, independent of the business functions, can provide a leverage-able foundation to support the reuse of applications, application capabilities, components, and business services.

The SRM establishes the following domains:

- Customer Services
- Process Automation Services
- Business Management Services
- Digital Asset Services
- Business Analytical Services
- Back Office Services
- Support Services

Each Service Domain is decomposed into Service Types. For example, the three Service Types associated with the Customer Services Domain are: Customer Preferences; Customer Relationship Management; and Customer Initiated Assistance. And each Service Type is decomposed further into components. For example, the four components within the Customer Preferences Service Type include: Personalization; Subscriptions; Alerts and Notifications; and Profile Management.

=== Data Reference Model (DRM) ===
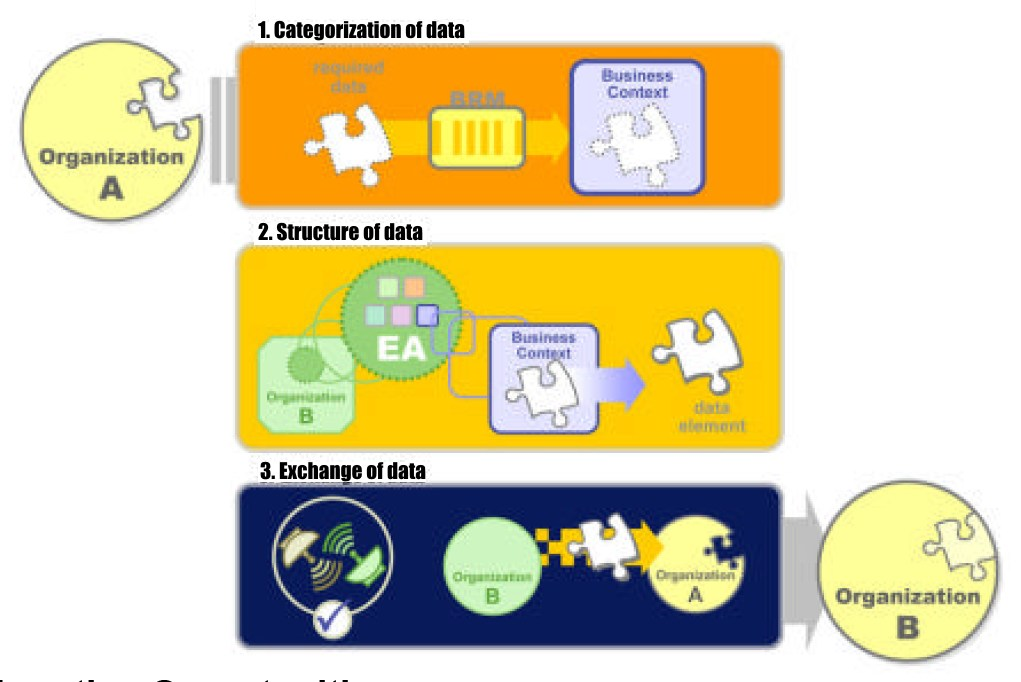
The DRM Collaboration Process.

The Data Reference Model (DRM) describes, at an aggregate level, the data and information that support government program and business line operations. This model enables agencies to describe the types of interaction and exchanges that occur between the federal government and citizens. The DRM categorizes government information into greater levels of detail. It also establishes a classification for federal data and identifies duplicative data resources. A common data model will streamline information exchange processes within the federal government and between government and external stakeholders.

Volume One of the DRM provides a high-level overview of the structure, usage, and data-identification constructs. This document:

- Provides an introduction and high-level overview of the contents that will be detailed in Volumes 2–4 of the model;
- Encourages community of interest development of the remaining volumes; and
- Provides the basic concepts, strategy, and structure to be used in future development.

The DRM is the starting point from which data architects should develop modeling standards and concepts. The combined volumes of the DRM support data classification and enable horizontal and vertical information sharing.

=== Technical Reference Model (TRM) ===
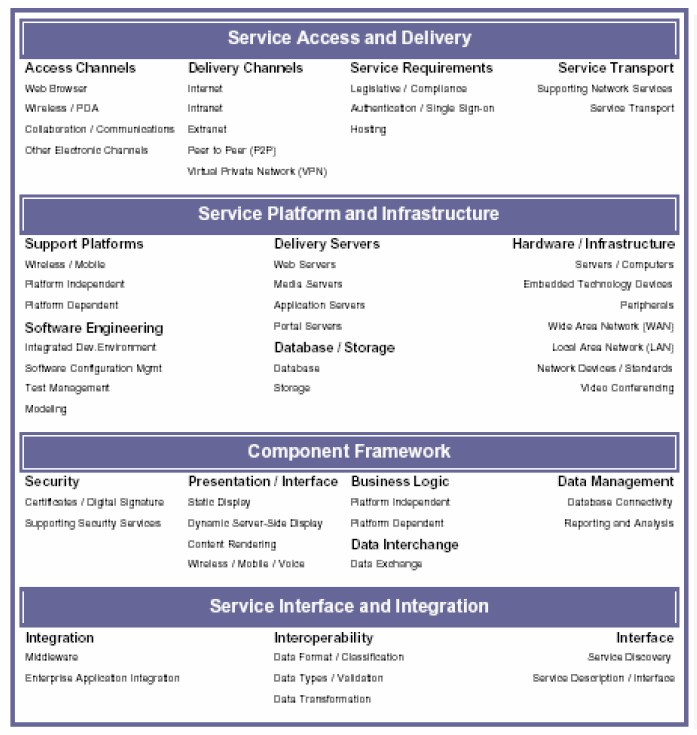
Technical Reference Model.

The TRM is a component-driven, technical framework categorizing the standards and technologies to support and enable the delivery of Service Components and capabilities. It also unifies existing agency TRMs and E-Gov guidance by providing a foundation to advance the reuse and standardization of technology and Service Components from a government-wide perspective.

The TRM consists of:

- Service Areas : represent a technical tier supporting the secure construction, exchange, and delivery of Service Components. Each Service Area aggregates the standards and technologies into lower-level functional areas. Each Service Area consists of multiple Service Categories and Service Standards. This hierarchy provides the framework to group standards and technologies that directly support the Service Area. (Purple headings)
- Service Categories : classify lower levels of technologies and standards with respect to the business or technology function they serve. In turn, each Service Category comprises one or more Service Standards. (Bold-face groupings)
- Service Standards : define the standards and technologies that support a Service Category. To support agency mapping into the TRM, many of the Service Standards provide illustrative specifications or technologies as examples.(Plain text)

The figure on the right provides a high-level depiction of the TRM.

Aligning agency capital investments to the TRM leverages a common, standardized vocabulary, allowing interagency discovery, collaboration, and interoperability. Agencies and the federal government will benefit from economies of scale by identifying and reusing the best solutions and technologies to support their business functions, mission, and target architecture. Organized in a hierarchy, the TRM categorizes the standards and technologies that collectively support the secure delivery, exchange, and construction of business and application Service Components that may be used and leveraged in a component-based or service-oriented architecture.

== Architecture levels ==
In the FEA, enterprise, segment, and solution architectures provide different business perspectives by varying the level of detail and addressing related but distinct concerns. Just as enterprises are themselves hierarchically organized, so are the different views provided by each type of architecture. The Federal Enterprise Architecture Practice Guidance (2006) has defined three types of architecture:

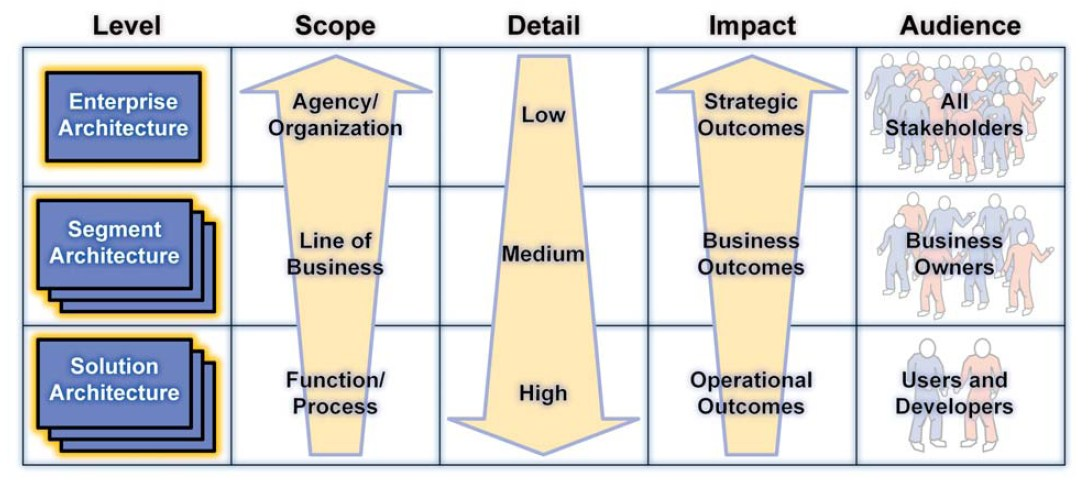
Federal Enterprise Architecture levels and attributes

- Enterprise architecture,
- Segment architecture, and
- Solution architecture.

By definition, Enterprise Architecture (EA) is fundamentally concerned with identifying common or shared assets – whether they are strategies, business processes, investments, data, systems, or technologies. EA is driven by strategy; it helps an agency identify whether its resources are properly aligned to the agency mission and strategic goals and objectives. From an investment perspective, EA is used to drive decisions about the IT investment portfolio as a whole. Consequently, the primary stakeholders of the EA are the senior managers and executives tasked with ensuring the agency fulfills its mission as effectively and efficiently as possible.

By contrast, "segment architecture" defines a simple roadmap for a core mission area, business service, or enterprise service. Segment architecture is driven by business management and delivers products that improve the delivery of services to citizens and agency staff. From an investment perspective, segment architecture drives decisions for a business case or group of business cases supporting a core mission area or common or shared service. The primary stakeholders for segment architecture are business owners and managers. Segment architecture is related to EA through three principles:

- structure: segment architecture inherits the framework used by the EA, although it may be extended and specialized to meet the specific needs of a core mission area or common or shared service.
- reuse : segment architecture reuses important assets defined at the enterprise level including: data; common business processes and investments; and applications and technologies.
- alignment : segment architecture aligns with elements defined at the enterprise level, such as business strategies, mandates, standards, and performance measures.

"Solution architecture" defines agency IT assets such as applications or components used to automate and improve individual agency business functions. The scope of a solution architecture is typically limited to a single project and is used to implement all or part of a system or business solution. The primary stakeholders for solution architecture are system users and developers. Solution architecture is commonly related to segment architecture and enterprise architecture through definitions and constraints. For example, segment architecture provides definitions of data or service interfaces used within a core mission area or service, which are accessed by individual solutions. Equally, a solution may be constrained to specific technologies and standards that are defined at the enterprise level.

== Program results ==
The official report to the U.S. Congress in 2011 reported that "most departments and agencies reported they expect to realize the benefits from their respective enterprise architecture programs [...] sometime in the future. What this suggests is that the real value in the federal government from developing and using enterprise architectures remains largely unrealized".

== See also ==
- Business reference model
- Department of Defense Architecture Framework
- FDIC Enterprise Architecture Framework
- Physical data model
- Reference model
- Treasury Enterprise Architecture Framework
