= Business reference model =

Example of the US FEA Business Reference Model.

Business reference model (BRM) is a reference model, concentrating on the functional and organizational aspects of the core business of an enterprise, service organization or government agency.

In enterprise engineering a business reference model is part of an Enterprise Architecture Framework or Architecture Framework. An Enterprise Architecture Framework defines in a series of reference models, how to organize the structure and views associated with an Enterprise Architecture.

== Overview ==
A reference model in general is a model of something that embodies the basic goal or idea of something and can then be looked at as a reference for various purposes. A business reference model is a means to describe the business operations of an organization, independent of the organizational structure that perform them. Other types of business reference model can also depict the relationship between the business processes, business functions, and the business area’s business reference model. These reference model can be constructed in layers, and offer a foundation for the analysis of service components, technology, data, and performance.

The most familiar business reference model is the "Business Reference Model", one of five reference models of the Federal Enterprise Architecture of the US Federal Government. That model is a function-driven framework for describing the business operations of the Federal Government independent of the agencies that perform them. The Business Reference Model provides an organized, hierarchical construct for describing the day-to-day business operations of the Federal government. While many models exist for describing organizations - organizational charts, location maps, etc. - this model presents the business using a functionally driven approach.

== History ==
One of the first business reference models ever defined was the "IMPPACT Business Reference Model" around 1990, which was the result of a research project in the Computer Integrated Manufacturing (CIM) field of the ESPRIT1 programme. Gielingh et al. (1933) described:

The IMPPACT Business Reference Model is expressed in the generic language constructs provided by IDEF0... It describes the requirements for CIM seen from a business point of view. Views modelled are manufacturing activities, real and information flow objects resource objects (information and material processing components) and organisational aspects (departments and their relations to activities and resources). The complete manufacturing system (including the production system and its management) is modelled by the IMPPACT Business Reference Model. Management covers both the planning of the production and the planning and control of this production.

The term IMPPACT stood for Integrated Manufacturing of Products and Processes using Advanced Computer Technologies Furthermore, in its framework were incorporated CIMOSA as reference model, NIAM for information modelling, and the data modeling language EXPRESS for information structure implementation.

In the 1990s, business reference models were hardly an item. An exception was a 1991 book about IT management, which mentioned that the Kodak management had developed a business reference model 10 years earlier. A 1996 manual of the SAP R/3 enterprise resource planning software stipulated the existence on the business reference model of the R/3 System. However, in the 1990s there was a significant development of reference models in related fields, which, resulted in the developments of Integrated business planning, the Open System Environment Reference Model, the Workflow Reference Model, TOGAF and the Zachman Framework.

In the new millennium business reference models started emerging in several fields from network management systems, and E-business, to the US Federal government. The US Federal government published its "Business Reference Model", Version 1.0 in February 2002. Related developments in this decade were the development of the Treasury Enterprise Architecture Framework, and the OASIS SOA Reference Model.

== Specific models ==
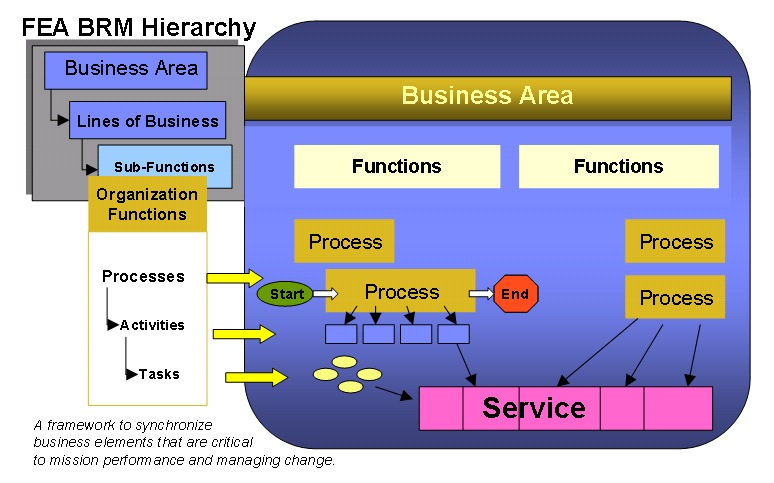
Other view on the FEA Business reference model.

The US Federal Government has defined a Federal Enterprise Architecture structures of the five FEA reference models:

- Performance Reference Model (PRM)
- Business Reference Model (BRM)
- Service Component Reference Model (SRM)
- Technical Reference Model (TRM)
- Data Reference Model (DRM)

The Federal Government Business Reference Model (FA BRM) provides an organized, hierarchical construct for describing the day-to-day business operations of the Federal government. While many models exist for describing organizations - org charts, location maps, etc. - this model presents the business using a functionally driven approach. The Lines of Business and Sub-functions that comprise the BRM represent a departure from previous models of the Federal government that use antiquated, stovepiped, agency-oriented frameworks. The BRM is the first layer of the Federal Enterprise Architecture and it is the main viewpoint for the analysis of data, service components and technology.

== See also ==
- Business model
- Business process modeling
- Enterprise Architecture framework
- Enterprise modelling
- Organizational architecture
- Outline of consulting
- View model
