= National Defense Authorization Act =

Family of United States laws authorizing DoD spending

The National Defense Authorization Act (NDAA) is any of a series of United States federal laws specifying the annual budget and expenditures of the U.S. Department of Defense. The first NDAA was passed in 1961. The U.S. Congress oversees the defense budget primarily through two yearly bills: the National Defense Authorization Act and defense appropriations bills. The authorization bill is the jurisdiction of the Senate Armed Services Committee and House Armed Services Committee and determines the agencies responsible for defense, establishes recommended funding levels, and sets the policies under which money will be spent. The appropriations bill provides funds.

Secret law in the form of classified addenda have been usually been included in NDAAs, intelligence authorization acts (IAAs), and Department of Defense appropriations acts (DODAAs) since the 1970s.

The passage of a Defense Authorization Act is often used by Congress to honor a senior congress member or other individual. For example, the National Defense Authorization Act for Fiscal Year 2001 is known as the "Floyd D. Spence National Defense Authorization Act for Fiscal Year 2001" in honor of Representative Floyd D. Spence of South Carolina, who had died earlier that year.

== Legislation from 1981 to present ==
Year	Short or popular title	Public law	Statute compilation	Description
1981	Department of Defense Authorization Act, 1981	Pub. L. 96–342		
1982	Department of Defense Authorization Act, 1982	Pub. L. 97–86		
1983	Department of Defense Authorization Act, 1983	Pub. L. 97–252		
1984	Department of Defense Authorization Act, 1984	Pub. L. 98–94	COMPS-483 (details)	
1985	Department of Defense Authorization Act, 1985	Pub. L. 98–525	COMPS-13734 (details)	
1986	Department of Defense Authorization Act, 1986	Pub. L. 99–145	COMPS-10454 (details)	
1987	National Defense Authorization Act for Fiscal Year 1987	Pub. L. 99–661	COMPS-1483 (details)	
1988	National Defense Authorization Act for Fiscal Years 1988 and 1989	Pub. L. 100–180	COMPS-10572 (details)	
1989	National Defense Authorization Act, Fiscal Year 1989	Pub. L. 100–456	COMPS-634 (details)	
1990	National Defense Authorization Act for Fiscal Years 1990 and 1991	Pub. L. 101–189	COMPS-10634 (details)	
1991	National Defense Authorization Act for Fiscal Year 1991	Pub. L. 101–510	COMPS-10716 (details)	
1992	National Defense Authorization Act for Fiscal Years 1992 and 1993	Pub. L. 102–190	COMPS-10656 (details)	
1993	National Defense Authorization Act for Fiscal Year 1993	Pub. L. 102–484	COMPS-10665 (details)	Also named as Former Soviet Union Demilitarization Act of 1992.
1994	National Defense Authorization Act for Fiscal Year 1994	Pub. L. 103–160	COMPS-10823 (details)	
1995	National Defense Authorization Act for Fiscal Year 1995	Pub. L. 103–337	COMPS-10826 (details)	
1996	National Defense Authorization Act for Fiscal Year 1996	Pub. L. 104–106 (text) (PDF)	COMPS-10709 (details)	Includes the Clinger–Cohen Act, containing the Federal Acquisition Reform Act of 1996 and Information Technology Management Reform Act of 1996.
1997	National Defense Authorization Act for Fiscal Year 1997	Pub. L. 104–201 (text) (PDF)	COMPS-10712 (details)	
1998	National Defense Authorization Act for Fiscal Year 1998	Pub. L. 105–85 (text) (PDF)	COMPS-10714 (details)	
1999	Strom Thurmond National Defense Authorization Act for Fiscal Year 1999	Pub. L. 105–261 (text) (PDF)	COMPS-10715 (details)	
2000	National Defense Authorization Act for Fiscal Year 2000	Pub. L. 106–65 (text) (PDF)	COMPS-10423 (details)	
2001	Floyd D. Spence National Defense Authorization Act for Fiscal Year 2001	Pub. L. 106–398 (text) (PDF)	COMPS-10420 (details)	
2002	National Defense Authorization Act for Fiscal Year 2002	Pub. L. 107–107 (text) (PDF)	COMPS-10411 (details)	
2003	Bob Stump National Defense Authorization Act for Fiscal Year 2003	Pub. L. 107–314 (text) (PDF)	COMPS-10410 (details)	
2004	National Defense Authorization Act for Fiscal Year 2004	Pub. L. 108–136 (text) (PDF)	COMPS-10407 (details)	
2005	Ronald W. Reagan National Defense Authorization Act for Fiscal Year 2005	Pub. L. 108–375 (text) (PDF)	COMPS-10404 (details)	
2006	National Defense Authorization Act for Fiscal Year 2006	Pub. L. 109–163 (text) (PDF)	COMPS-10388 (details)	
2007	John Warner National Defense Authorization Act for Fiscal Year 2007	Pub. L. 109–364 (text) (PDF)	COMPS-10387 (details)	Formally named after John Warner, a U.S. war veteran, long-term Senator, Senate Armed Services Committee chairman, and Secretary of the Navy from Virginia.
2008	National Defense Authorization Act for Fiscal Year 2008	Pub. L. 110–181 (text) (PDF)	COMPS-10386 (details)	
2009	Duncan Hunter National Defense Authorization Act for Fiscal Year 2009	Pub. L. 110–417 (text) (PDF)	COMPS-11478 (details)	"Expresses the sense of Congress that the Honorable Duncan Hunter, Representative from California, has discharged his official duties with integrity and distinction, has served the House of Representatives and the American people selflessly, and deserves the sincere gratitude of Congress and the Nation". Title 8, Subtitle G: Governmentwide Acquisition Improvements, is known as the "Clean Contracting Act", and focused on improvements to government procurement such as limiting the term of non-competitive contracts to one year (section 862) and prohibiting excessive use by contractors of sub-contractors or "tiers of sub-contractors" (section 866).
2010	National Defense Authorization Act for Fiscal Year 2010	Pub. L. 111–84 (text) (PDF)	COMPS-11477 (details)	Contains important hate crimes legislation.
2011	Ike Skelton National Defense Authorization Act for Fiscal Year 2011	Pub. L. 111–383 (text) (PDF)	COMPS-11476 (details)	Formally named after Ike Skelton, a long-term Congressman and Chairman of the House Armed Services Committee from Missouri.
2012	National Defense Authorization Act for Fiscal Year 2012	Pub. L. 112–81 (text) (PDF)	COMPS-10045 (details)	Contains several controversial sections, the chief being §§ 1021–1022, which affirm provisions authorizing the indefinite military detention of civilians, including U.S. citizens, without habeas corpus or due process, contained in the Authorization for Use of Military Force (AUMF), Pub. L. 107–40 (text) (PDF).
2013	National Defense Authorization Act for Fiscal Year 2013	Pub. L. 112–239 (text) (PDF)	COMPS-10359 (details)	
2014	National Defense Authorization Act for Fiscal Year 2014	Pub. L. 113–66 (text) (PDF)	COMPS-11141 (details)	A United States federal law that specified the budget and expenditures of the United States Department of Defense (DOD) for Fiscal Year 2014. The law authorized the DOD to spend $607 billion in Fiscal Year 2014. On December 26, 2013, President Barack Obama signed the bill into law. This was the 53rd consecutive year that a National Defense Authorization Act has been passed.
2015	Carl Levin and Howard P. "Buck" McKeon National Defense Authorization Act for Fiscal Year 2015	Pub. L. 113–291 (text) (PDF)	COMPS-11977 (details)	One of the proposed NDAA bills for fiscal year 2015. On May 8, 2014, the House Armed Services Committee ordered the bill reported (amended) by a vote of 61-0. The Committee spent 12 hours debating the bill and voting on hundreds of different amendments before voting to pass it.
2016	National Defense Authorization Act for Fiscal Year 2016	Pub. L. 114–92 (text) (PDF)	COMPS-11831 (details)	
2017	National Defense Authorization Act for Fiscal Year 2017	Pub. L. 114–328 (text) (PDF)	COMPS-13740 (details)	
2018	National Defense Authorization Act for Fiscal Year 2018	Pub. L. 115–91 (text) (PDF)	COMPS-13932 (details)	
2019	John S. McCain National Defense Authorization Act for Fiscal Year 2019	Pub. L. 115–232 (text) (PDF)	COMPS-15483 (details)	Formally named after John S. McCain III, a U.S. war veteran, prisoner of war, long-term Senator, Chairman of the Senate Armed Services Committee, and 2008 Republican Presidential Nominee.
2020	National Defense Authorization Act for Fiscal Year 2020	Pub. L. 116–92 (text) (PDF)	COMPS-15772 (details)	Formally established the United States Space Force as an independent branch of the Armed Forces.
2021	William M. (Mac) Thornberry National Defense Authorization Act for Fiscal Year 2021	Pub. L. 116–283 (text) (PDF)	COMPS-16736 (details)	Formally named after William McClellan "Mac" Thornberry, a long-term Congressman, and ranking member of the House Armed Services Committee.
2022	National Defense Authorization Act for Fiscal Year 2022	Pub. L. 117–81 (text) (PDF)	COMPS-16861 (details)	
2023	James M. Inhofe National Defense Authorization Act for Fiscal Year 2023	Pub. L. 117–263 (text) (PDF)	COMPS-17475 (details)	Named after James M. Inhofe, a long-term Senator, and ranking member of the Senate Armed Services Committee.
2024	National Defense Authorization Act for Fiscal Year 2024	Pub. L. 118–31 (text) (PDF)	COMPS-17632 (details)	
2025	National Defense Authorization Act for Fiscal Year 2025	Pub. L. 118–159 (text) (PDF)	COMPS-18280 (details)	
2026	National Defense Authorization Act for Fiscal Year 2026	Pub. L. 119–60 (menu; GPO has not yet published law)	COMPS-18412 (details)	
2027	National Defense Authorization Act for Fiscal Year 2027			

== See also ==
- International affairs budget of the United States
- McCarran Internal Security Act
