= A130 =

A130, A.130 or A-130 may refer to:

- A130 road, a road in England
- Russian route A130, a highway in Russia
- Aero A.130, a Czechoslovak biplane light bomber and reconnaissance aircraft
- OMB Circular A-130, US government circular
- RFA Gold Ranger (A130), a Ranger-class fleet support tanker
