= Feral information systems =

A feral information system is part of an information system developed by individuals and groups to help with day-to-day activities that is not condoned by management. It is called feral because it circumvents existing information technology systems or works around key system architecture.

== Overview ==
A feral information system can be written for a variety of reasons. The general reason given is that they are ways of working around existing management information systems in order to support day-to-day work. Feral information systems are sometimes referred to as shadow systems.

== Reasons for feral information systems ==
Reasons for feral information systems include: poor training practices in IT firms, inadequate systems, complex political relationships and a host of related issues. Research has linked feral information systems to poor operational planning.
