= DAA =

DAA or Daa may refer to:

== People ==
- Ludvig Kristensen Daa, Norwegian historian, ethnologist, auditor, editor of magazines and newspapers, educator and politician
- Yinduu Daa, also known as Daai Chin, ethnic tribe of Myanmar
- Claus Daa, a Danish nobleman and landowner

== Technology ==
- Data access arrangement, in telecommunications
- Designated Approving Authority, in the US Department of Defense, an individual who provides oversight of an IT environment
- Detect and Avoid, a set of technologies designed to avoid interference of UWB upon other networks
- Direct Access Archive, a file format for disk images

=== Authentication ===
- Data Authentication Algorithm, a former American standard for authentication codes
- Digest access authentication, protocol for negotiating browser user credentials
- Direct anonymous attestation, remote authentication of a trusted computer

== Other ==
- Daa, a ward in the Arusha Region of Tanzania
- Danmarks Adels Aarbog, (Yearbook of the Danish Nobility), a genealogical publication
- Davison Army Airfield, Virginia, United States, a military airport
- Decare, a metric area unit equivalent to 1000 square metres
- Designers Against Aids, a non-profit organization which battles against AIDS, together with artists, designers and companies
- Diacetone alcohol, a chemical used as an intermediate and solvent
- Dictionary of Australian Artists
- Dubai American Academy, an educational institute located in Dubai, United Arab Emirates
- DAA (company), an Irish company that operates Dublin Airport and Cork Airport
- D-aspartic acid
