= Metrics Reference Model =

Reference library for performance metrics

The metrics reference model (MRM) is the reference model created by the Consortium for Advanced Management-International (CAM-I) to be a single reference library of performance metrics. This library is useful for accelerating to development of and improving the content of any organization's business intelligence solution.

== Background ==
The MRM was created by the Business Intelligence Working Group of CAM-I. Substantial secondary research performed by the group revealed that there was no single, central location for performance metrics information. All published material focused on a single dimension of performance metrics (e.g., financial), or focused on how to use such metrics to affect the performance of an organization. Exhaustive lists of performance metrics that were generic to nearly any organization across all aspects of the business (e.g., customer, product/service, employee) were not found. Furthermore, without a single reference point, no research was located where the relationships between these performance metrics had been documented and described.

== Overview ==
MRM is a technology agnostic reference model based on the basic elements of a generic organization for which cost, process, and performance improvements may be desired.

The model organized nearly 150 generic performance, process, and cost metrics around common organizational components so that they could be applied across public, private, and nonprofit organizations.

In keeping with CAM-I's generic model of an organization, these elements include:

- Customers (or business sustaining forces)
- Products and services
- Processes and activities
- Employees
- Finance
- Research and development
- Infrastructure
- Resources
- Suppliers

The figure below illustrates the flow between these components in a typical organization.

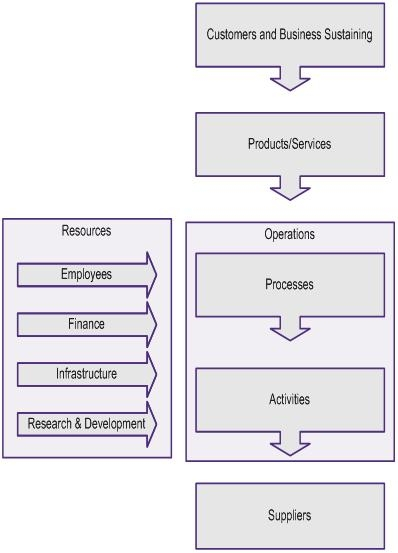
CAM-I's Generic Model of an Organization

== Content ==
For each of the organizational elements, the MRM provides a comprehensive list of cost, process, and performance metrics of possible interest to many organizations. For example, some of the performance metrics provided for the employee organizational element include average customer review, customer retention rate, sales per customer/spending rate, average quantity per customer order, order frequency, average number of orders per customer, and average customer lifetime value.

For each performance metric, this information is also provided:

- Type. Provides further levels of suborganization within the organizational element where sensible (e.g., Financial).
- Definition/Calculation. A generally accepted means of calculating the metric from measures is provided.
- Strengths/Opportunities. Known advantages for using the metric.
- Weaknesses/Problems/Risks. Known disadvantages for using the metric.
- Target Setting. A discussion of the desired outcome.
- Possible correlations/market basket of metrics. Consideration of other metrics and correlations of environmental factors are provided. This area explores the relationship of the measure against every other metric in the MRM, an indication of the strength of the relationship (e.g., weak, moderate, strong), and an indication to the type of relationship (e.g., negatively correlated, positively correlated).

== Value and use of the MRM ==
The benefit of the MRM is that each metric has already been identified, defined, and considered by a group of experienced business intelligence professionals. The idea of the MRM is for the business intelligence (BI) practitioner to follow these steps:

- Assess the requirements of the BI solution and determine which organization components apply.
- For each organizational component that applies, open this document to the associated MRM section.
- Review each of the measures.
- Identify measures of interest.
- Review the information provided about each measure and either accept or reject the measure for inclusion in the BI tool.
- Accumulate all desired measures in a list.
- Use the measures (or, if metrics are selected, use the measures in the Definition/Calculation column) to drive the BI data model.

=== Using the MRM in industry ===
How the MRM may be used practically in the industry depends on whether an individual or an organization is considered.

Individual interest in the MRM:

- Program analysts: Use the MRM to tailor to a specific program/organization.
- Managers: Use the MRM model to validate that the metrics selected represent the needs of their business.
- Strategic planners: Use the MRM to determine metric relationships and correlations in order to determine strategic decisions.
- Operational planners: Use the MRM to understand operational data points that you have control over to affect the metrics and understand the components of the metrics.
- BI practitioners: Use the MRM to define the BI requirements and calculations, as well as the interpretation of the data. Help the business owner determine the appropriate display of metrics.
- Vendors: Use the MRM to provide relevant products/services that answer clients’ needs out-of-the-box.
- Educators: Use the MRM to discuss the benefits and drawbacks of the various measures.

==== Organizational interest in the MRM ====
- New organizations/agencies, mergers and acquisitions
- Existing organizations that are starting performance measurement efforts
- Consulting organizations for use in client situations
- Software vendors
- Monitoring organizations
- Those with performance challenges (may have metrics, but not enough to interpret that metric)
- Those who do not wish to go through a large strategic planning exercise but want to start using best practice metrics for common functions
- Small budgets or time constraints or those that do not have the expertise to create metrics

==== Use cases ====
The MRM to be used in a number of different ways, including:

- Use as part of planning process. Rather than starting from a blank slate, go through each and add those that are specific to their organization. * Use to generate ideas. Customize existing, add specific to your organization
- Use as a cookbook. Select ingredients (metrics) of interest from each area when there are known objectives but want to save time.
- Use to refine existing program (rare), compare metrics vs. existing (completeness review)
- BI practitioner: Use for developing the calculations, finding the data needed to run the calculations, and building appropriate data structures
- For consulting organizations to provide more thorough results quickly (competitive advantage)
- For software vendors to provide specific applications
- Education tool (understanding strengths/weaknesses of metrics, etc.) for staff at all levels to understand what's important

== See also ==
- Business intelligence
- Reference model
- Performance management
- Performance metric
