= Operational plan =

Operational plan may refer to:

- Military purposes, see Operation plan or "OPLAN"
- Operational planning, see operational planning
