= Government Performance and Results Act =

1993 U.S. laws meant to improve government performance

Government Performance and Results Act of 1993
- Long title: An Act to provide for the establishment of strategic planning and performance measurement in the Federal Government, and for other purposes.
- Enacted by: the 103rd United States Congress

Citations
- Public law: Pub. L. 103-62
- Statutes at Large: 107 Stat. 285

Legislative history
- Introduced in the Senate as S. 20 by William Roth on January 21, 1993; Signed into law by President Bill Clinton on August 3, 1993

The Government Performance and Results Act of 1993 (GPRA) (Pub. L. 103–62) is a United States law enacted in 1993, one of a series of laws designed to improve government performance management. The GPRA requires agencies to engage in performance management tasks such as setting goals, measuring results, and reporting their progress. In order to comply with the GPRA, agencies produce strategic plans, performance plans, and conduct gap analyses of projects. The GPRA of 1993 established project planning, strategic planning, and set up a framework of reporting for agencies to show the progress they make towards achieving their goals.

The GPRA Modernization Act of 2010 took the existing requirements of the 1993 act and developed a more efficient and modern system for government agencies to report their progress.

== History ==
The Government Performance Act was signed by President Clinton on August 3, 1993 but not implemented until the year 1999. From the time it was signed, the government focused on data collection and preparation for the following fiscal year. The fiscal year for the federal budget always starts October 1 and ends September 30 the following year. Before the GPRA was enacted, there was an attempted piece of legislation in the 1960s trying to fulfill the task the GPRA now achieves; it was called the Program Planning and Budgeting System. Similar legislation also attempted to approach performance management such as Zero-Based Budgeting, Total Quality Management, and a few other minor programs. These were some of the many unsuccessful programs that tried to establish Federal Performance Budgeting. Where these other bills failed to receive enough legislative approval to be made into law, the GPRA was successfully approved by both Congress and the President. To ensure the GPRA continued to have a lasting impact, President Obama signed the Government Performance and Results Modernization Act of 2010 into law on January 4, 2011. The GPRA has fully served its intended purpose of agency goal reporting and achieving for twenty three years.

== Purposes of the 1993 Act ==
This act was established to gain the trust of the American people. The government will be held accountable for all programs' results to be achieved.

- Establish goal setting for all government agencies.
- Aid Congressional Committees in their ability to amend, suspend, or establish programs based on performance for each fiscal year.
- Improve the performance of all federal agencies and measure their effectiveness.
- Compare current results to previous years as a measure of effectiveness.
- Highlights the operational processes, skills, technology, human, capital information, or any other resources that are required to meet new goals for that specific year.

== The Three GPRA Elements ==
- Agencies are required to develop five-year strategic plans that must contain a mission statement for the agency as well as long-term, results-oriented goals covering each of its major functions.
- Agencies are required to prepare annual performance plans that establish the performance goals for the applicable fiscal year, a brief description of how these goals are to be met, and a description of how these performance goals can be verified.
- Agencies must prepare annual performance reports that review the agency's success or failure in meeting its targeted performance goals. The performance goals must cover each program activity made in the agency budget.

The Office of Management and Budget (OMB) is tasked pursuant to the GPRA with producing an annual report on agency performance. This is produced with the President's annual budget request.

The Executive branch oversees the implementation of the GPRA. The key component of the GPRA is for agencies to establish their goals and performance needed to achieve success in the particular agency or program. It also calls for agencies to clearly state their operational process, budgeting strategies, technology and skill positions, as well as, other resources necessary to meeting goals. Providing a strategy to compare the actual achievements of an agency to those performance goals they set out to achieve is also key.

== GPRA Modernization Act of 2010 ==
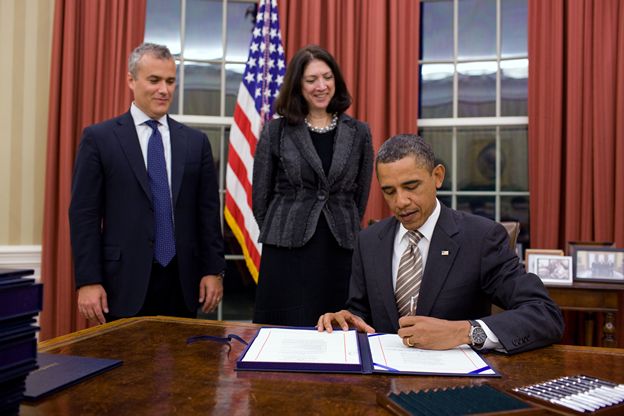
Signing of the GPRA Modernization Act at the White House with Jeffrey Zients, Shelley Metzenbaum, and Barack Obama (left to right)

On January 4, 2011, President Obama signed H.R. 2142, the GPRA Modernization Act of 2010 (GPRAMA), into law as Pub. L. 111–352 (text) (PDF). Section 10 requires agencies to publish their strategic and performance plans and reports in machine-readable formats. StratML is such a format. Agencies are required to identify "key factors external to the agency and beyond its control that could significantly affect the achievement of the general goals and objectives". Implementation of the act was led by the Office of Management and Budget which was led by Jeffrey Zients and his associate Shelley H. Metzenbaum.

== Performance plans and reports ==
Each report includes a list of performance goals for each program. This includes indicators that help measure the outcome for each goal. The performance achieved with a comparison with the performance levels and the goals they had set for the year. If the performance goal was not met for that fiscal year, an explanation has to be given for why the goals that were proposed were not met. Following up the explanation, they have to give a written plan of what they will do to meet their goals the following fiscal year. They have to give a description of how each goal was useful and how effective it was to the final result. These results will be sent to the President and to Congress. The results can be accessed by the public once they are published.

== See also ==
- Federal Acquisitions Streamlining Act
- Information Technology Management Reform Act (Clinger-Cohen Act)
