= Shelley H. Metzenbaum =

American nonprofit executive and government official

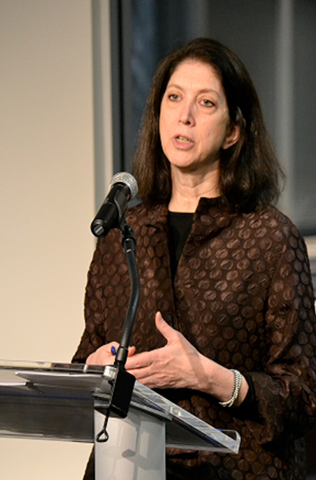
- Metzenbaum in 2011
- Born: Shelley Hope Metzenbaum; March 18, 1952 (age 74); Ohio, U.S.
- Spouse: Steven Kelman
- Children: 2
- Parent: Howard Metzenbaum (father)

Academic background
- Education: Stanford University; Harvard Kennedy School
- Thesis: Making the most of interstate bidding wars for business (1992)

Shelley Hope Metzenbaum (born March 18, 1952) is an American nonprofit executive, academic, and former government official specializing in public sector performance management. She was the founding president of the Volcker Alliance and worked in the Office of Management and Budget during the Obama administration. Metzenbaum is a fellow of the National Academy of Public Administration.

== Early life and education ==
Metzenbaum is a native of Ohio. Born to a Jewish American family, she is the daughter of Shirley Louise Turoff and Howard Metzenbaum. Metzenbaum is the third of four daughters.

Metzenbaum completed her Ph.D. at Harvard University's Kennedy School of Government in 1992, where her doctoral thesis focused on lessons for state governments on bidding tactics to use when attempting to attract businesses. It was based on a case study of bidding wars for GM's Saturn plant and the MicroElectronics Computer Corporation. Previous to this, she received a Masters in Public Policy from the Kennedy School and completed her Bachelor of Arts, with an emphasis on humanities and Asian studies, at Stanford University.

== Early career ==
In the late 1980s, Metzenbaum served as the director of the Office of Capital Planning and Budgeting for the Commonwealth of Massachusetts. In that role she was responsible for the Commonwealth's capital budgeting, planning and monitoring of capital projects. In the early 1990s, she served as the undersecretary of the Massachusetts Executive Office of Environmental Affairs. She oversaw employees in five Commonwealth agencies and reformed the environmental permitting process to cut processing times and increase revenues. She also initiated reforms of the Commonwealth's Superfund program and led a project resulting in the creation of the New England Environmental Business Council.

== Career ==
=== Clinton administration ===
In 1993, Metzenbaum was appointed by President Clinton to serve as Associate Administrator for Regional Operations and State/Local Relations for the United States Environmental Protection Agency in Washington, D.C., a position she served in until 1997. She was responsible for management of EPA's ten regional offices and EPA's relationships with states and localities. She led the design and implementation of the National Environmental Performance Partnership System, which used data to streamline management attention to identifying potential problems and developing interventions.

=== Academia ===
After her service in the Clinton administration, Metzenbaum was a Visiting Professor and Senior Research Fellow at the University of Maryland School of Public Policy. At the University of Maryland, she was faculty chair of an executive education program on the policy-making process in science-based federal agencies originally developed for the U.S. Food and Drug Administration. While at the University of Maryland, Metzenbaum wrote on performance accountability which the George W. Bush administration cited as an example for improving government programs. Metzenbaum has also analyzed performance management of the Charles River cleanup. Her work on using information from state governments has been cited by researchers examining accountability in New Mexico. Prior to her position at the University of Maryland, she served as adjunct faculty at the Brookings Institution, running the "Science and Technology Policy" and "Managing for Results" programs. In 2008, Metzenbaum became the founding director of the Edward J. Collins Jr. Center for Public Management at the University of Massachusetts Boston. In that role, she developed a university-based resource center for improving public performance management at the federal, state, and local levels. For example, the Center coordinates MassStat, a consortium of local governments committed to learning from each other's experiences in using data to make performance decisions.

=== Obama administration ===
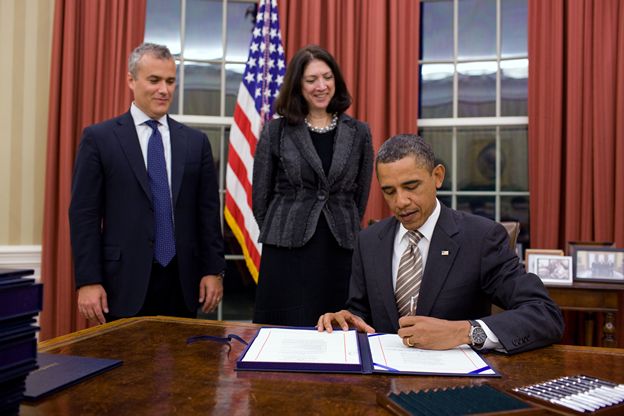
Signing of the Government Performance and Results Act of 2010 at the White House with Jeffrey Zients, Metzenbaum, and Barack Obama (from left to right).

In 2009, Metzenbaum was appointed by President Obama as the Associate Director for Performance and Personnel Management at the U.S. Office of Management and Budget (OMB). In this role, she was responsible for implementation of the Government Performance and Results Act of 2010, which requires strategic planning, goal-setting, annual performance reporting on all federal agency goals, and quarterly performance reporting and data-driven reviews on every agency's priority goals. She discussed the program in a 2010 meeting at the State Department in Washington, DC. She established the performance.gov website, which she discussed in a 2011 article in The Washington Post. She also led the government-wide Performance Improvement Council and was responsible for guiding government-wide personnel policy. Her task to improve government performance is used as a case study by Harvard's John F. Kennedy School of Government and is used as an example of how to efficiently make changes in government in G. Edward DeSeve's book The Presidential Appointee's Handbook. In a 2011 review on the Obama administration's programs, Philip Joyce noted she was brought on as a 'highly regarded' colleague. and Christopher Koliba noted that she advocated for increased studies of performance management systems. When she left the Office of Management and Budget in 2013, Metzenbaum described the advances made in evaluating government performance.

=== Volcker Alliance ===
Metzenbaum left the federal government in May 2013 to serve as the president of the Volcker Alliance, founded by former United States Federal Reserve Chairman Paul A. Volcker. A nonpartisan organization based in New York City, The Volcker Alliance aims to support public sector employees. In 2013 interviews with The Washington Post and Governing News, Metzenbaum described how she planned to use her position as president of the Volcker Alliance to restore the public's confidence in government. Metzenbaum spoke with the Federal News Network in 2014 about successes and failures in government, and testified before Congress on the lessons learned while working on the Government Performance and Results Act of 2010. Metzenbaum established advisory groups to advise policy makers on means to improve the federal government, and worked with then-governor of Washington State Jay Inslee to improve the effectiveness of government in Washington State. She also presented public lectures on performance management at Australian National University, was a keynote speaker during Boston University's initiative on modern city and at a Washington State meeting on government performance, and has written editorials for the New York Times. At the end of 2016, Metzenbaum talked with people at GovLoop about the U.S. government highlights of 2016 and what to expect from the presidency of Donald Trump.

=== Subsequent work ===
Metzenbaum led the Richardson Panel discussion at the 2019 American Society for Public Administration conference.

== Selected publications ==
- Metzenbaum, Shelley H.; Rivlin, Alice M. (2008). "From Oversight to Insight: Federal Agencies as Learning Leaders in the Information Age". In Timothy J. Conlan and Paul L. Posner (ed.). Intergovernmental Management for the 21st Century. Brookings Institution Press. pp. 209–242. ISBN 9780815715412. JSTOR 10.7864/j.ctt6wphh3.
- Kunreuther, Howard; Metzenbaum, Shelley H.; Schmeidler, Peter (2006). "Mandating Insurance and Using Private Inspections to Improve Environmental Management". In Cary Coglianese, Jennifer Nash (ed.). Leveraging the private sector : management-based strategies for improving environmental performance. Internet Archive. Washington, DC : Resources for the Future. pp. 137–163. ISBN 978-1-891853-95-1.
- Metzenbaum, Shelley H. (2002). "Measurement that Matters: Cleaning Up the Charles River". In Donald F. Kettl (ed.). Environmental governance : a report on the next generation of environmental policy. Internet Archive. Washington, D.C. : Brookings Institution Press. pp. 58–117. ISBN 978-0-8157-9866-8.
- Metzenbaum, Shelley H. (2001). Cary Coglianese, Jennifer Nash (ed.). Regulating from the inside: can environmental management systems achieve policy goals?. Washington, DC: Resources for the Future. ISBN 978-1-936331-34-5. OCLC 670429656.
- Metzenbaum, Shelley H. (December 2003). "Strategies for Using State Information: Measuring and Improving Performance | IBM Center for The Business of Government". www.businessofgovernment.org.

== Awards and honors ==
In 2002, Metzenbaum was elected a fellow to the National Academy of Public Administration, an honor that was mentioned in the Journal of Public Affairs Education. In 2011, she was named one of the Federal Computer Week's Federal 100, in recognition for her leadership on performance issues. Metzenbaum was the graduation speaker for the Fels Institute of Government at the University of Pennsylvania's 2013 commencement. In 2020, Metzenbaum was honored with the Getzen lecture on government accountability at the University of Georgia.

== Personal life ==
Metzenbaum is married to Harvard professor Steven Kelman. They have two adult children.
