= Operational planning =

Management topic

Operational planning (OP) is the process of implementing strategic plans and objectives to achieve specific goals. In an Introduction to Management and Organizational Behavior, Barbara Carlin and Marina Sebastijanovic states that operational planning is one of the four basic types of planning involved in organizational management. (Note: The other basic types are strategic, tactical, and contingency planning.)

== Function and preparation ==
An operational plan (or operations plan) describes the specific steps in a strategic planning model and explains how and what portion of resources will be put into operation during a given operational period: in the case of commercial- or government budget balance, a fiscal year. An operational plan is the basis for, and justification of, an annual operating budget needed to achieve an overall strategic plan.

An operational plan draws from an organization's strategic plans to describe program missions and goals, program objectives, and program activities. While an operational plan may differ depending on the sector, the core components of an operational plan includes benchmarking and determining how progress is measured.

The operations plan is both the first and the last step in preparing an operating budget request. As the first step, the operations plan provides a plan for resource allocation; as the last step, the OP may be modified to reflect policy decisions or financial changes made during the budget development process.

Operational plans are generally prepared by the people who will be involved in implementation. There is often a need for cross-departmental dialogue as plans created by one part of the organization can affect other parts.

Operational plans should contain:

- Identifying clear objectives to be achieved
- Details that are aligned with the strategic plan
- Ensuring staffing and resource requirements
- Performance management

== See also ==
- Integrated business planning
- Government Performance and Results Act
