= Data Reference Model =

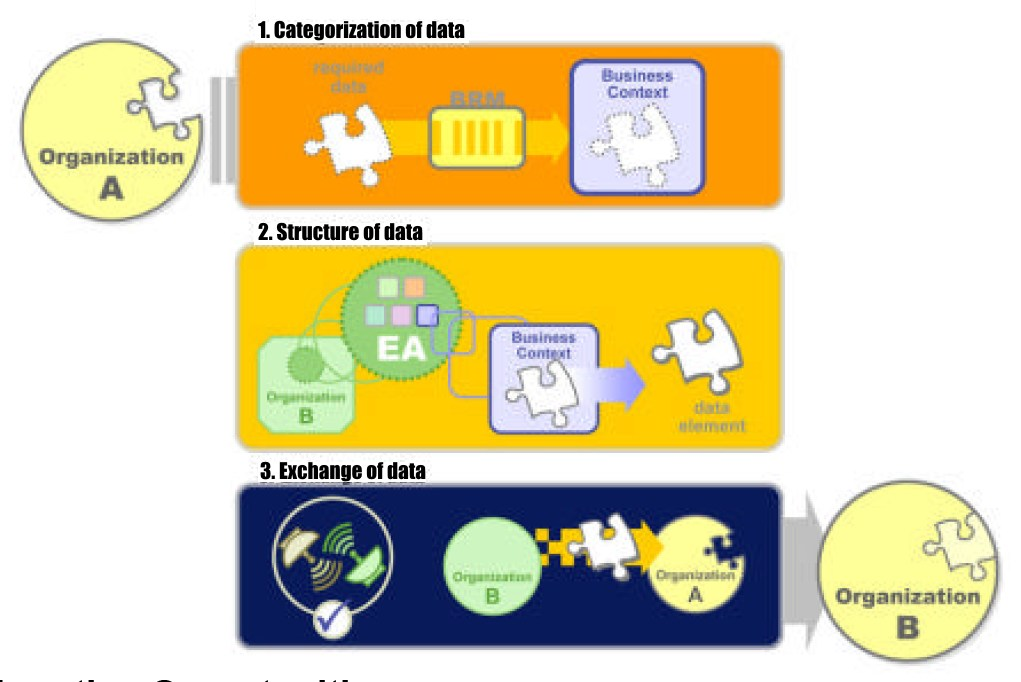
The Data Reference Model Collaboration Process

The Data Reference Model (DRM) is one of the five reference models of the Federal Enterprise Architecture.

== Overview ==
The DRM is a framework whose primary purpose is to enable information sharing and reuse across the United States federal government via the standard description and discovery of common data and the promotion of uniform data management practices. The DRM describes artifacts which can be generated from the data architectures of federal government agencies. The DRM provides a flexible and standards-based approach to accomplish its purpose. The scope of the DRM is broad, as it may be applied within a single agency, within a community of interest, or cross-community of interest.

== Data Reference Model topics ==
=== DRM structure ===
The DRM provides a standard means by which data may be described, categorized, and shared. These are reflected within each of the DRM's three standardization areas:

- Data Description: Provides a means to uniformly describe data, thereby supporting its discovery and sharing.
- Data Context: Facilitates discovery of data through an approach to the categorization of data according to taxonomies. Additionally, enables the definition of authoritative data assets within a community of interest.
- Data Sharing: Supports the access and exchange of data where access consists of ad hoc requests (such as a query of a data asset), and exchange consists of fixed, re-occurring transactions between parties. Enabled by capabilities provided by both the Data Context and Data Description standardization areas.

=== DRM Version 2 ===
The Data Reference Model version 2 released in November 2005 is a 114-page document with detailed architectural diagrams and an extensive glossary of terms.

The DRM also make many references to ISO standards specifically the ISO/IEC 11179 metadata registry standard.

=== DRM usage ===
The DRM is not technically a published technical interoperability standard such as web services, it is an excellent starting point for data architects within federal and state agencies. Any federal or state agencies that are involved with exchanging information with other agencies or that are involved in data warehousing efforts should use this document as a guide.

== See also ==
- Enterprise architecture framework
- Enterprise application integration
- Enterprise service bus
- Federal Enterprise Architecture
- ISO/IEC 11179
- Metadata publishing
- Semantic spectrum
- Semantic web
- Synonym ring
