= OMB Circular A-130 =

OMB Circular A-130, titled Managing Information as a Strategic Resource, is one of many government circulars produced by the United States Federal Government to establish policy for executive branch departments and agencies.

Circular A-130 was first issued in December 1985 to meet information resource management requirements that were included in the Paperwork Reduction Act (PRA) of 1980. Specifically, the PRA assigned responsibility to the OMB Director to develop and maintain a comprehensive set of information resources management policies for use across the Federal government, and to promote the application of information technology to improve the use and dissemination of information in the operation of Federal programs. The initial release of the Circular provided a policy framework for information resources management (IRM) across the federal government.

Since the time of the Circular's first release in 1985, Congress has enacted several additional laws and OMB issued several guidance documents that related to information technology management in federal agencies. To account for these new laws and guidance, OMB has revised the Circular three times, in 1994, 1996, and 2000. A complete rewrite of the Circular to both update and to correct for known deficiencies has been considered since at least 2005, but as of October 2014, this rewrite has not yet occurred. A revised version was released on July 27, 2016.

As expressed in the US Federal CIO Council's Architecture Alignment and Assessment Guide (2000), Circular A-130 can be thought of as a "one-stop shopping document for OMB policy and guidance on information technology management".

== Specific Guidance ==
A-130 includes specific guidelines that require

- all federal information systems to have security plans
- systems to have formal emergency response capabilities
- a single individual to have responsibility for operational security
- Federal Management and Fiscal Integrity Act reports to Congress be made in regards to the security of the system
- security awareness training be available to all government users, administrators of the system
- regular review and improvement upon contingency plans for the system to be done

== Federal DAA Involvement ==
The Federal Designated Approving Authority has specific requirements and responsibilities provided by this circular. It is required that this individual should be a management official, knowledgeable in the information and processes supported by the system. The individual should also know the management, personnel, operational, and technical controls used in the protection of this system.

The Federal DAA is also responsible for the security of this system as well as the use of the security products and techniques used therein.

== Authorities ==
A-130 establishes official OMB policy and guidance on information technology management for federal executive agencies based on the following laws, Executive Orders, and prior OMB guidance documents:

Laws:

- the Paperwork Reduction Act (PRA) of 1980 (amended by the Paperwork Reduction Act of 1995[44 U.S.C. Chapter 35])
- the Clinger-Cohen Act (Pub L. 104–106, Division E)
- the Privacy Act of 1974, as amended [5 U.S.C. 552a]
- the Chief Financial Officers Act of 1990 (31 U.S.C. 3512 et seq.)
- the Federal Property and Administrative Services Act of 1949, as amended [40 U.S.C. 487]
- the Computer Security Act of 1987 (Pub. L. 100–235)
- the Budget and Accounting Act, as amended [31 U.S.C. Chapter 11]
- the Government Performance and Results Act of 1993(GPRA)
- the Office of Federal Procurement Policy Act (41 U.S.C. Chapter 7)
- the Government Paperwork Elimination Act of 1998 (Pub. L. 105–277, Title XVII)

Executive Orders:

- Executive Order 12046 of March 27, 1978 ("Relating to the transfer of telecommunications functions")
- Executive Order 12472 of April 3, 1984 ("Assignment of national security and emergency preparedness telecommunications functions")
- Executive Order 13011 of July 17, 1996 ("Federal Information Technology")

Other OMB circulars:

- OMB Circular A-11 (Preparation, Submission, and Execution of the Budget)

Prior OMB guidance documents: (All below have been rescinded after incorporation of guidance content into A-130):

- M-96-20 Implementation of the Information Technology Reform Act of 1996
- M-97-02 Funding Information Systems Technology
- M-97-09 InterAgency Support for Information Technology
- M-97-15 Local Telecommunications Services Policy
- M-97-16 Information Technology Architectures

Any information that the information system uses that is classified automatically requires the system to have National security emergency preparedness guidelines that conform to Executive Order 12472.
