= OGC Reference Model =

The OGC Reference Model describes a framework for the ongoing work of the Open Geospatial Consortium (OGC) and their specifications and implementing interoperable solutions and applications for geospatial services, data, and applications. It is not an OGC standard.

It has the following purposes:

- Provides a foundation for coordination and understanding (both internal and external to OGC) of ongoing OGC activities and the Technical Baseline;
- Update/Replacement of parts of the 1998 OpenGIS Guide;
- Describes the OGC requirements baseline for geospatial interoperability;
- Describes the OGC architecture framework through a series of non-overlapping viewpoints: including existing and future elements;
- Regularize the development of domain-specific interoperability architectures by providing examples.
