= Integrated business planning =

Type of planning strategy

Integrated business planning (IBP) is a business management process that aims to align strategic, operational, and financial planning into a single, integrated process.

== Objective ==
Integrated business planning (IBP) is used by organizations to integrate various functions and align strategic, operational, and financial planning. Key aspects often included in IBP frameworks are:

1. Functional Integration: IBP aims to integrate departments within an organization and align them functionally. It seeks to create a unified planning process that connects functions such as research and development (R&D), manufacturing, supply chain management, marketing, and sales, incorporating inputs from each to form a common business plan.

2. Harmonization of Planning Cycles:: IBP involves synchronizing planning activities across multiple timelines, aligning monthly, quarterly, and annual planning cycles. It uses a framework designed to address discrepancies arising from separate starting points and data sets to create a unified schedule.

3. Integrating across multiple Planning Horizons:: IBP facilitates collaboration between sales and marketing teams to capture demand and create a consensus plan for the short and medium term.

4. Medium and Long-Term Financial Planning:: IBP aims to align demand forecasts with pricing data and inputs from marketing teams to develop financial plans and predict financial outcomes.

5. Long-Term Strategic Planning:: IBP may integrate New Product Introduction phases by incorporating insights from product development portfolios.

6. Capacity Expansion Planning:: IBP may include capacity expansion planning by aligning long-term plans with new product development, cost improvement projects, and management of existing product portfolios. The long-term strategic plan serves as an input. These demand elements are matched against mapped capacity data in the system to conduct gap analysis.

IBP seeks to balance different objectives to achieve an overall result, potentially using prescriptive analytics. These tools are often used to mathematically optimize parts of a plan, such as inventory investment. Some advanced IBP processes may attempt to mathematically optimize multiple aspects of a plan.

== History ==
The history of integrated business planning (IBP) is linked to the development of sales and operations planning (S&OP), which emerged in the 1980s. S&OP sought to balance demand and manufacturing resources. IBP evolved from S&OP, aiming to address perceived limitations by combining financial planning, strategic planning, sales, and operations planning into a unified process.

Over time, IBP has evolved, sometimes combining elements of Enterprise Performance Management (EPM) and S&OP. Some IBP platforms leverage predictive analytics and machine-learning technology., enabling demand sensing and automated forecasting and providing real time planning capabilities supported by cloud based deployment models

== Criticism ==
Some sources argue that IBP is not distinct from S&OP. Patrick Bower has described IBP as a marketing hoax,⁣ claiming it is a name developed to create confusion and sell consulting and system services. Others assert that IBP is not a marketing hoax⁣ but a component of Enterprise Performance Management (EPM) system.

Another criticism is that IBP lacks a widely accepted academic definition and is perceived by some as having a bias towards a supply chain perspective. The absence of a standard academic definition allows for varying interpretations, which can lead to confusion among practitioners. A 2015 S&OP survey found that 32% of participants felt there was no difference between S&OP and IBP, 20% "did not know," and 71% felt there was a need for more industry standards around S&OP.

The lack of formal governance and a unified industry definition for IBP has been noted. In the absence of widely accepted standards, there has been an attempt to create an open-source definition for IBP:

A holistic planning philosophy, where all organizational functions participate in providing executives periodically with valid, reliable information, in order to decide how to align the enterprise around executing the plans to achieve budget, strategic intent and the envisioned future.

— Supply Chain Trend, 2015

== Academic literature ==
According to The Journal of Business Forecasting, integrating Sales and Operations Planning (S&OP) and Collaborative Planning, Forecasting and Replenishment (CPFR) can provide information for decision-making and may influence success factors and performance outcomes.

The journal Information & Management discusses the integration of information systems planning (ISP) with business planning (BP) for strategic information systems planning. The study examines four ways these plans can be integrated and how this integration relates to organizational success, based on a survey of business planners and IS executives. The results suggest that increased integration may correlate with improved IS contribution to organizational success and fewer ISP problems, according to the paper.

Pal Singh Toor & Dhir discuss integrated business planning, forecasting, and process management. The paper highlights the role of business intelligence and integrated planning processes, using case studies to illustrate potential benefits.

== See also ==
- Business process modeling
- Business reference model
- Business intelligence
- Business Relationship Management
