= Segment architecture =

Segment architecture is a detailed, formal description of areas within an enterprise, used at the program or portfolio level to organize and align change activity.

It defines a simple roadmap for a core mission area, business service, or enterprise service. Segment architecture is driven by business management and delivers products that improve the delivery of services to citizens and agency staff. From an investment perspective, segment architecture drives decisions for a business case or group of business cases supporting a core mission area or common or shared service. The primary stakeholders for segment architecture are business owners and managers. Segment architecture is related to Enterprise architecture (EA) through three principles:

- Structure: segment architecture inherits the framework used by the EA, although it may be extended and specialized to meet the specific needs of a core mission area or common or shared service.
- Reuse: segment architecture reuses important assets defined at the enterprise level including: data; common business processes and investments; and applications and technologies.
- Alignment: segment architecture aligns with elements defined at the enterprise level, such as business strategies, mandates, standards, and performance measures.

== See also ==
- Enterprise architecture
- Solution architecture
