= Core business =

Main activity of an organization

The core business of an enterprise is an idealized construct intended to express that organization's "main" or "essential" commercial activity, through which it offers specific products or services to the market in order to generate revenue and profit.

Core business process means that a business's success depends not only on how well each department performs its work, but also on how well the company manages to coordinate departmental activities to conduct the core business process, which is:

1. The market-sensing process. Gathering marketing intelligence and acting on the information.
2. The new-offering realization process. Research, development and launching new quality offerings quickly and within budget.
3. The customer acquisition process. Defining the target market and prospecting for new customers
4. The customer relationship management process. Building deeper understanding, relationships and offerings to individual customers.
5. The fulfillment management process. Receiving and approving orders, shipping out on time and collecting payment.

In business, a core item is defined as an item that is immediately responsible for the revenues and cash flows of that particular business, whereas a non-core item is of a more strategic view, intended to benefit the revenue model and cash flows of the core items.

Therefore, one way to identify a core business function is to look at whether the primary cash flows of the business revenue model runs directly through it, or not. Core business functions are by standard immediately involved in the primary cash flows of the revenue model or models of the business, whereas non-core business functions typically are not, which means that the business can hypothetically operate without non-core business functions without impacting primary cash flows, whereas the core business functions are essential to the continuance of its primary cash flows.

For a business to be competitive, it may seek advantages outside of its own operations. This involves analyzing the value chain of suppliers, distributors, and customers. Some companies partner with specific suppliers and distributors to develop a value delivery network.

== See also ==
- Core competency
