= Federal Acquisition Reform Act of 1996 =

The Federal Acquisition Reform Act of 1996 was U.S. national legislation enacted as Division D of the National Defense Authorization Act for Fiscal Year 1996 (110 Stat. 186; Pub. L. 104–106 (text) (PDF)). Together with the Information Technology Management Reform Act of 1996, it is known as the Clinger–Cohen Act.
