= Designated Approving Authority =

The Designated Approving Authority, in the United States Department of Defense, is the official with the authority to formally assume responsibility for operating a system at an acceptable level of risk. The new official term that has replaced DAA is Authorizing Official (AO).

== Definition ==
This position is defined by the Department of Defense Directive 8500.1 (Information Assurance) - E2.1.13. Designated Approving Authority (DAA).

As an example. The National Security Agency (NSA) may recommend to a unified command to operate at a certain classification range; e.g. U.S. Special Operations Command or U.S. Central Command. The Command-in-Chief of the unified command (CENTCOM or SOCOM) would be the DAA, giving him/her the ability to override NSA recommendations.

== Synonyms ==
This term is synonymous with "Designated Accrediting Authority" and "Delegated Accrediting Authority".
