= Clinger–Cohen Act =

Part of the National Defense Authorization Act of 1996

The Clinger–Cohen Act of 1996 encompasses two laws that were together passed as part of the National Defense Authorization Act for Fiscal Year 1996 (NDA) (S. 1124; Pub. L. 104–106 (text) (PDF)):

- The Federal Acquisition Reform Act of 1996 was Division D of the NDA
- The Information Technology Management Reform Act of 1996 was Division E of the NDA

It represented the "first time in law that agency CIO positions were established with designated roles and responsibilities."
