= Cutter IT Journal =

Cutter Business Technology Journal (CBTJ) (formerly American Programmer) is an independent magazine for programmers and software technologists.

== History and profile ==
The magazine was founded with the name American Programmer in 1987. It was founded and published by Edward Yourdon, inventor of the Yourdon Method of structured systems analysis and design methodology (SSADM) and the Coad/Yourdon Object-Oriented Analysis Methodology. The magazine is published on a monthly basis and has its headquarters in Arlington, Massachusetts.

In the early '90s, Cutter Information Corp. (now Cutter Consortium) partnered with Ed Yourdon to publish American Programmer, which was later renamed Cutter IT Journal and then "Cutter Business Technology Journal."

Cutter Business Technology Journal differs from academic journals in that it does not use a peer review process. Each month, CBTJ's guest editor commissions articles by business-technology practitioners that include case studies, research findings, and experience-based opinion on business and technology topics.
