= Information flow diagram =

Business process model

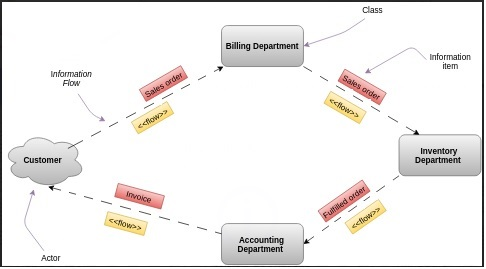
Annotated information flow diagram

An information flow diagram (IFD) is a diagram that shows how information is communicated (or "flows") from a source to a receiver or target (e.g. A→C), through some medium. The medium acts as a bridge, a means of transmitting the information. Examples of media include word of mouth, radio, email, etc. The concept of IFD was initially used in radio transmission. The diagrammed system may also include feedback, a reply or response to the signal that was given out. The return paths can be two-way or bi-directional: information can flow back and forth.

An IFD can be used to model the information flow throughout an organisation. An IFD shows the relationship between internal information flows within an organisation and external information flows between organisations. It also shows the relationship between the internal departments and sub-systems.

An IFD usually uses "blobs" to decompose the system and sub-systems into elemental parts. Lines then indicate how the information travels from one system to another. IFDs are used in businesses, government agencies, television and cinematic processes.

IFDs are often confused with data-flow diagrams (DFDs). IFDs show information as sources, destination and flows. DFDs show processes where inputs are transformed into outputs. Databases are also present in DFDs to show where data is held within the systems. In DFDs information destinations are called "sinks".

== Purpose ==
Peter Checkland, a British management scientist, described information flows between the different elements that compose various systems. He also defined a system as a "community situated within an environment".

The main purpose of an information flow diagram is so that sources that send and receive information can be displayed neatly and analysed. This allows viewers to see the forwarding of information and the analysis of different situations. The creation of an IFD is, in most cases, the first step in information analysis.

IFDs are behaviour diagrams that show the exchange of data between systems. They are also used to describe the circulation of information within systems.

Information that moves along the diagram is represented as either information items or by concrete classifiers. IFDs are used to:

- Develop a high level overview of the flow of information in an organisation.
- Highlight detailed flows in an individual task.
- Describe the flow of information inside and around organisations and between departments.
- Understand business process bottlenecks in sequential, deferred, real-time, parallel, wheel, one-to-many, many-to-many and many-to-one-to-many information flows.

== Features and construction of IFD ==
Construction of an information flow diagram requires the knowledge of different information sources and the connections between them. The sources and targets of information flow are one of the following: actor, use case, node, artefact, class, component, port, property, interface, package, activity node, activity partition, or instance specification.

A dashed line with an open arrow pointing away from the source to the target is used to represent information flow. The keyword "flow" may be written above or below the dashed line. Information items represent the abstraction of data and act as information flow connectors, representing the flow of transfer of information from source to target. Information items do not provide any detail of the information they transfer as they are featureless.

Diagramming software can be used to create IFDs. Examples of diagramming software include Microsoft Visio for Windows or OmniGraffle for OS X.

Successful IFDs should highlight gaps that need improvement, display inefficiencies in information, uncover and highlight risks to information such as data confidentiality and Insecure systems, display unsuitable mediums which are being used, and they should also provide clarity about who should receive which information when, where and how.

=== Example situation ===
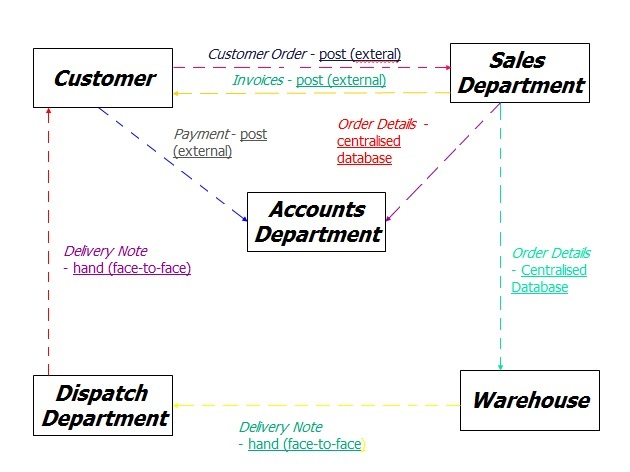
Example: Customer posts an order.

A customer needs to make an order. The customer first posts the order to the sales department. The customer's order details are then entered into a centralised database which can only be accessed by the warehouse to make the order. The goods are handed to the dispatch department with a delivery note attached to them for delivery. On delivery, the customer receives the goods and the delivery note (which are handled by a member of the dispatch department). The sales department then creates an invoice which is posted to the customer. The accounts department then assesses a copy of the invoice from the centralised database. The customer is then required to post the payment to the accounts department.

== Limitations ==
Limitations of information flow diagrams may include:

- The nature of information that is used in the IFD and the mechanisms by which it is conveyed and exchanged, and the control conditions are not specified.
- The signal given out and the signal received are in many cases different. This also applies to feedback messages, due to distortions.
- The intentions of messages sometimes not understood when receiving a signal and message.
- Information items do not provide details about the information they transfer as they don't have features, generalisations or associations.
- Detail about timing (what happens when) is not given.

== See also ==
- Access Control Matrix
- Business Process Model and Notation
- Information cascade
- Information systems
- NIAM / Object-role modeling
- System context diagram
- Systems thinking
