= Rise and Resurrection of the American Programmer =

1996 book by Edward Yourdon

- First edition
- Author: Edward Yourdon
- Publisher: Prentice Hall
- Publication date: 1996
- Publication place: United States
- Media type: Print
- ISBN: 978-0-13-956160-3
- OCLC: 37457822
- Dewey Decimal: 005.1 21
- LC Class: QA76.6 .Y6682 1998
- Preceded by: Decline and Fall of the American Programmer

Rise and Resurrection of the American Programmer is a book written by Edward Yourdon in 1996. It is the sequel to Decline and Fall of the American Programmer.

== Synopsis ==
In the original, written at the beginning of the 1990s, Yourdon warned American programmers that their business was not sustainable against foreign competition. By the middle of the decade Microsoft had released Windows 95, which marked a groundbreaking new direction for the operating system, the internet was beginning to rise as a serious consumer marketplace, and the Java software platform had made its first public release. Due to such large changes in the state of the software industry, Yourdon reversed some of his original predictions.
