= Hatley–Pirbhai modeling =

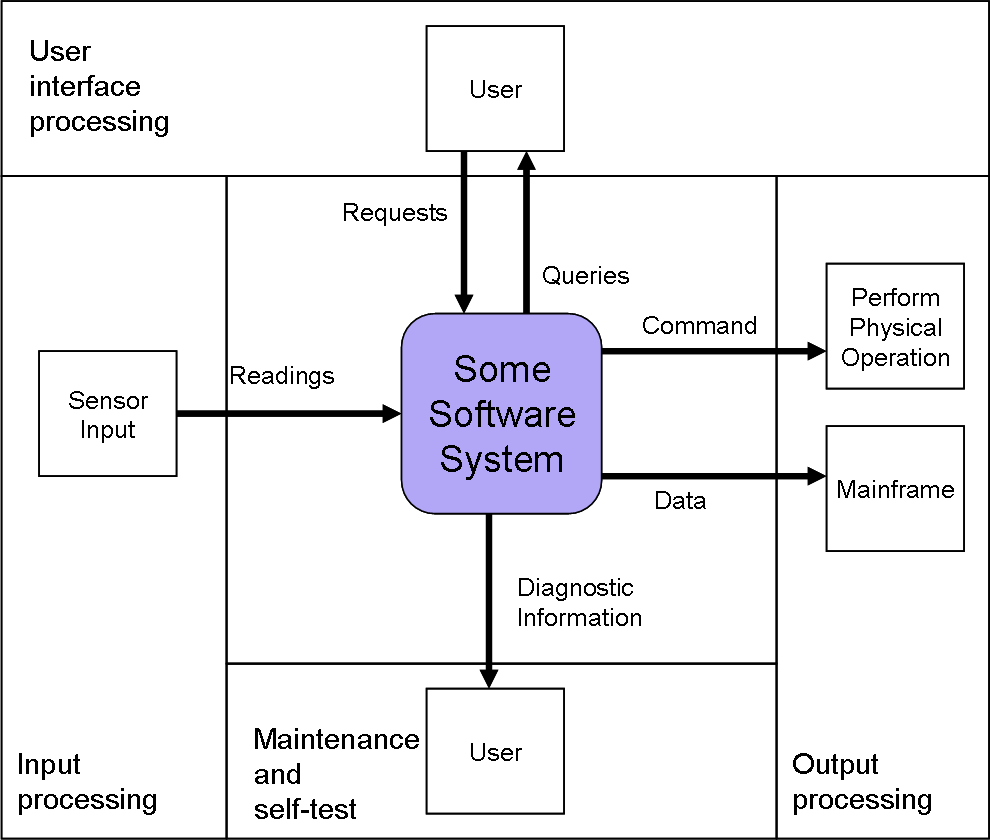
A sample system context diagram using Hatley–Pirbhai modeling

Hatley–Pirbhai modeling is a system modeling technique based on the input–process–output model (IPO model), which extends the IPO model by adding user interface processing and maintenance and self-testing processing.

== Overview ==
The five components—inputs, outputs, user interface, maintenance, and processing—are added to a system model template to allow for modeling of the system which allows for proper assignment to the processing regions. This modeling technique allows for creation of a hierarchy of detail of which the top level of this hierarchy should consist of a context diagram. The context diagram serves the purpose of "establish[ing] the information boundary between the system being implemented and the environment in which the system is to operate." Further refinement of the context diagram requires analysis of the system designated by the shaded rectangle through the development of a system functional flow block diagram. The flows within the model represent material, energy, data, or information.
