= Process specification =

Process Specification is a business term for the specification of a process. It is not unique to business activity, but can be applied to any organizational activity.

Within some structured methods, the capitalized term Process Specification refers to a description of the procedure to be followed by an actor within an elementary level business activity, as represented on a process model such as a dataflow diagram or IDEF0 model. A common alias is minispec, short for miniature specification.

== Use in systems development ==
The process specification defines what must be done to transform inputs into outputs. It is a detailed set of instructions outlining a business procedure that each elementary level business activity is expected to carry out. Process specifications are commonly included as integral components of requirements documents in systems development.

== Techniques ==
A variety of approaches can be used to produce a process specification, including:

- Decision tables
- Structured English (favored technique of most systems analysts)
- Pre/post conditions
- Use cases, basic course or events/alternate paths in use cases
- Flowcharts
- Nassi–Shneiderman diagrams
- UML Activity diagrams

No matter what approach is used, a specification must communicate to system development designers, implementers and support professionals, and be verifiable by stakeholders and end users.

== See also ==
- Specification (technical standard)
