= Multilevel Flow Modeling =

Industrial modeling framework

Multilevel Flow Modeling (MFM) is a framework for modeling industrial processes.

MFM is a kind of functional modeling employing the concepts of abstraction, decomposition, and functional representation. The approach regards the purpose, rather than the physical behavior of a system as its defining element. MFM hierarchically decomposes the function of a system along the means-end and whole-part dimensions in relation to intended actions. Functions are syntactically modeled by the relations of fundamental concepts contributing as part of a subsystem. Each subsystem is considered in the context of the overall system in terms of the purpose (end) of its function (means) in the system. Using only a few fundamental concepts as building blocks allows qualitative reasoning about action success or failure. MFM defines a graphical modeling language for representing the encompassed knowledge.

== History ==
MFM originated as a modeling language for capturing how human operators identify and handle unknown operation situations in order to improve the design of human-machine interfaces.

== Syntax ==
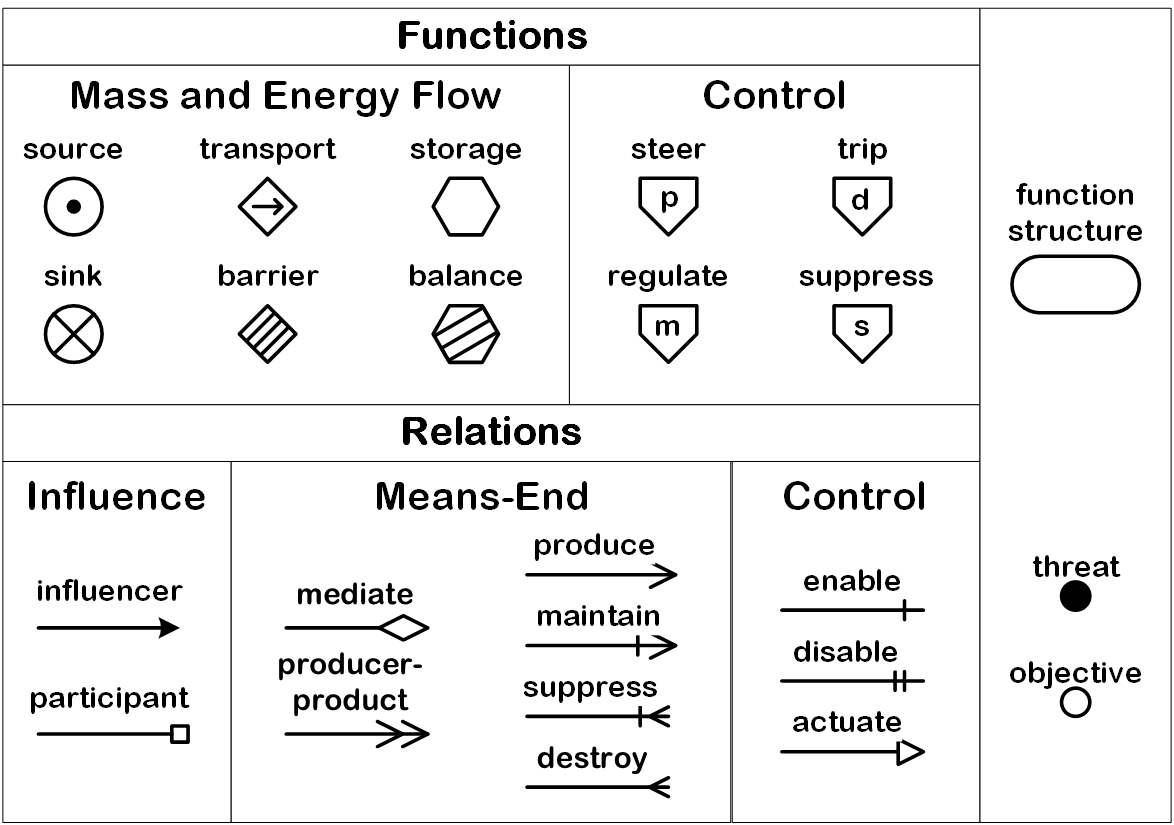
MFM concepts for functions and relations

MFM describes the function of a system as a means for a specific end in terms of mass and energy flow. The flow is the defining element for the underlying function concepts. The concepts of transport and barrier play the most important role, as they connect pairs of the other function types, reflecting the physical flows in the system. Sink and source functions mark the boundary of the considered system and the end or beginning of a flow. Storage and balance concepts can both be collection or splitting points for multiple flow paths.

Accordingly, valid MFM syntax requires a transport or a barrier linking two functions of the remaining four types. In addition to the flow within one perspective (mass or energy) MFM connects the influence between mass and energy by the means-end relations (mediate and producer-product) as well as the causal links introduced by the way the system is controlled by using separate control flow structures.

Diagnostic information about the causality between abnormal states through the system is inferred from the physical effect between the functions. Petersen distinguishes direct and indirect influence between functions:

- Direct influence is the effect of a transport taking in mass or energy from the upstream function and passing it on to the downstream function.
- Indirect influence, on the other hand, is derived from different physical implementations and represented by influence or participate relation of another function toward the transport. The state of transport can be affected e.g. by an abnormal state of influencing downstream storage, while the state would not be affected by a participating one.

According to the underlying physical interpretation inference rules for all possible patterns of flow functions have been established. Zhang compiled these patterns and the implied causality.

== Example ==
The MFM diagram of a heat pump reflects the overarching objective (cob2) of maintaining the energy level on the warm side constant. The energy flow structure efs2 shows the system function from the most prevalent (energetic) perspective which is further decomposed in the mass flow of coolant (mfs1) as the means for the desired energy transport. Further hierarchical analysis produces efs1 that represents the energy needed for the pump as a means to produce a part of the mass flow. The operational constraints introduced by control systems such as a water flow controller are modeled by cfs1 and a temperature controller cfs2.

Flow sheet of a heat pump with temperature and flow controllers, described by

MFM model of a heat pump with temperature and flow controllers, based on

== Application ==
MFM based solutions for many aspects of industrial automation have been proposed. Research directions include:

- Plant wide diagnosis
- Alarm Management
- Risk Assessment
- Automatic procedure generation
