= Prosa Structured Analysis Tool =

Prosa Structured Analysis Tool is a visual systems and software development environment which supports industry standard SA/SD/RT structured analysis and design with real-time extensions modeling method. Prosa supports data flow diagrams, state transition diagrams and entity relationship diagrams using Chen's and Bachmans ER notations. Prosa has integrated data dictionary.

Prosa actively guides the designer to create correct and consistent graphic diagrams. Prosa offers interactive checking between diagrams. Concurrent documentation integration ensures real-time link from design to documentation.

Prosa automates diagram creation and checking, and produces C++, C#, Java code headers and SQL DDL for implementation. Concurrent documentation ensures accurate documents which are consistent with the software design.

Prosa has an established position in analysis and design tool business. Prosa is used in areas like system and software development, telecommunications, automation, car manufacturing, machinery, banking, insurance, defense/military, research, integrated circuit design, etc.

== See also ==
- Structured Analysis
