= Cutter Consortium =

- Company type: Private
- Industry: Information technology research
- Founded: 1986
- Headquarters: Arlington, Massachusetts, United States
- Key people: Karen Fine Coburn (founder)
- Website: www.cutter.com

Cutter Consortium, founded by Karen Fine Coburn in 1986, is an information technology research company based in Arlington, Massachusetts.

== History ==
Cutter Information Corp. was founded by Karen Fine Coburn in 1986. In 1990, Cutter purchased the rights to the American Programmer journal (since renamed to Cutter Business Technology Journal), and partnered with Ed Yourdon to form the Cutter Consortium.

In June 2020, Cutter Consortium has been purchased by Arthur D. Little. The acquisition was to extend the consultancy platform and build a value proposition for the next century driven by digital consultancy and transparent problem-solving.
