= Tom DeMarco =

American software engineer, author (born 1940)

- Born: August 20, 1940 (age 86); Hazleton, Pennsylvania, U.S.
- Education: Cornell University, Columbia University, University of Paris
- Known for: Structured analysis
- Awards: Stevens Award (1999)
- Scientific career
- Fields: Computer science
- Workplaces: Bell Labs

Tom DeMarco (born August 20, 1940) is an American software engineer, author, and consultant on software engineering topics. He was an early developer of structured analysis in the 1970s.

== Early life and education ==
Tom DeMarco was born in Hazleton, Pennsylvania. He received a BSEE degree in Electrical Engineering from Cornell University, a M.S. from Columbia University, and a diplôme from the University of Paris.

== Career ==
DeMarco started working at Bell Telephone Laboratories in 1963, where he participated in ESS-1 project to develop the first large scale Electronic Switching System, which became installed in telephone offices all over the world. Later in the 1960s he started working for a French IT consulting firm, where he worked on the development of a conveyor system for the new merchandise mart at La Villette in Paris, and in the 1970s on the development of on-line banking systems in Sweden, Holland, France and New York.

In the 1970s DeMarco was one of the major figures in the development of structured analysis and structured design in software engineering. In January 1978 he published Structured Analysis and System Specification, a major milestone in the field.

In the 1980s with Tim Lister, Stephen McMenamin, John F. Palmer, James Robertson and Suzanne Robertson, he founded the consulting firm "The Atlantic Systems Guild" in New York. The Guild developed into a New York- and London-based consulting company specializing in methods and management of software development.

DeMarco has lectured and consulted throughout the Americas, Europe, Africa, Australia and the Far East.

He is a member of the ACM and a Fellow of the IEEE. He lives in Camden, Maine, and is a principal of the Atlantic Systems Guild, and a fellow and Senior Consultant of the Cutter Consortium. DeMarco was the 1986 recipient of the Warnier Prize for "lifetime contribution to the field of computing", and the 1999 recipient of the Stevens Award for "contribution to the methods of software development".

== Publications ==
=== Tech and Business Books ===
- Peopleware: Productive Projects and Teams with co-author Tim Lister, Addison-Wesley Professional; 3 edition (July 1, 2013)
- Slack: Getting Past Burnout, Busywork, and the Myth of Total Efficiency Random House, Broadway Books Division, 2001.
- Happy to Work Here: Understanding and Improving the Culture at Work with co-authors Tim Lister, Peter Hruschka, Steve McMenamin and Suzanne Robertson. New Atlantic (2021)
- Adrenaline Junkies and Template Zombies: Understanding Patterns of Project Behavior with co-authors Tim Lister, Peter Hruschka, Steve McMenamin and Suzanne Robertson, Dorset House (March, 2008). Winner of the 2009 Jolt Award.
- Waltzing With Bears: Managing Risk on Software Projects with co-author, Tim Lister, Dorset House (March 2003). Winner of the 2004 Jolt Award.
- The Deadline: A Novel About Project Management. New York: Dorset House Press, 1997.Winner of the 1998 Jolt Award.
- Why Does Software Cost So Much? (And Other Puzzles of the Information Age). New York: Dorset House, 1995.
- Controlling Software Projects: Management, Measurement and Estimation. Englewood Cliffs, NJ: Prentice-Hall, 1982.
- Concise Notes on Software Engineering. Englewood Cliffs, NJ: Prentice-Hall, 1980.
- Structured Analysis and System Specification. Englewood Cliffs, NJ: Prentice-Hall, 1979.
- Software State of the Art: Selected Papers of the 1980s Editor (with co-editor, Tim Lister). New York: Dorset House, 1990.

=== Mainstream Fiction ===
- The One-Way Time Traveler. Artful Press, 2019.
- A Ruby Beam of Light. Double Dragon Publishing, 2016.
- Airship Nation. Double Dragon Publishing, 2016.
- Als auf der Welt das Licht ausging. Carl Hanser Verlag, 2015. (translated from "Andronescu's Paradox" ?)
- Dark Harbor House (a comic novel). Down East Books, 2001.
- Lieutenant America and Miss Apple Pie (short story collection) Down East Books, 2003.

== See also ==
- Software metric
- Software quality
- Structured Systems Analysis and Design Method
