= Data island =

A data island is a data store, such as on a PDA or other computing device, that has non-existent or limited external connectivity. This limits the ability of the user to synchronize with or copy the data to other devices. Though new data can be added to the system, the ability to move that data elsewhere is impractical or impossible. Data islands, in general, contain a very huge set of data relative to its small physical space that it occupies.

The connectivity here does not necessarily imply a hardware interface. For example, it may be a result of poorly written system interface software.

A data island is a subset of entities that are connected to each other via relationships, but that are independent of other entities within the same data store.
