= HIPO model =

Systems analysis design aid

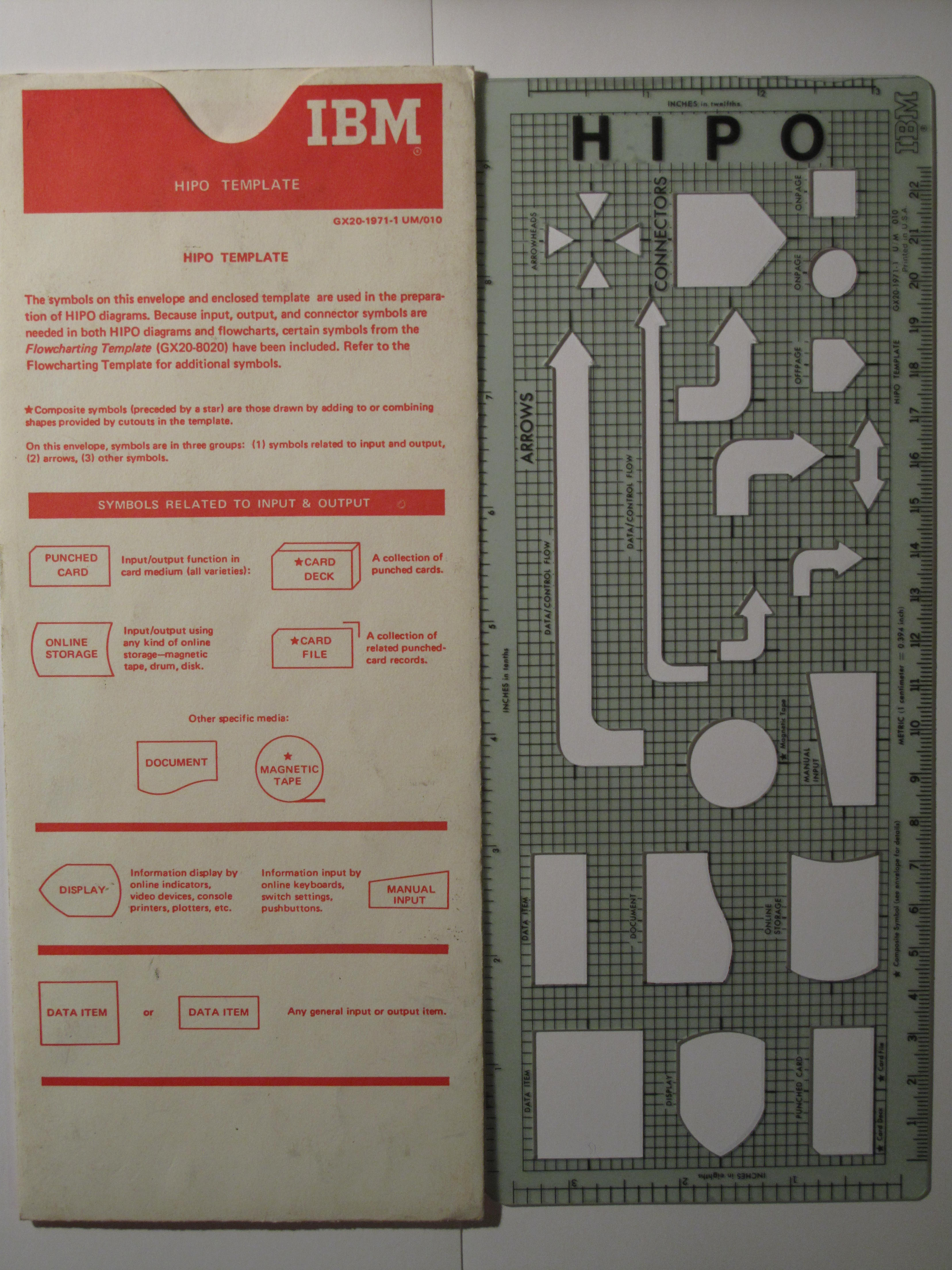
IBM stencil for HIPO.

HIPO model (hierarchical input process output model) is a systems analysis design aid and documentation technique from the 1970s, used for representing the modules of a system as a hierarchy and for documenting each module.

== History ==
to develop requirements, construct the design, and support implementation of an expert system to demonstrate automated rendezvous. Verification was then conducted systematically because of the method of design and implementation.

The overall design of the system is documented using HIPO charts or structure charts. The structure chart is similar in appearance to an organizational chart, but has been modified to show additional detail. Structure charts can be used to display several types of information, but are used most commonly to diagram either data structures or code structures.

== See also ==
- IPO model
- SIPOC
