= SofTech =

SofTech, Inc.
- Industry: CAD/CAM, PLM Software
- Founded: Boston, Massachusetts, USA (1969)
- Fate: Acquired
- Headquarters: Lowell, Massachusetts
- Key people: Douglas T. Ross, Founder
- Website: www.softech.com

SofTech, Inc. was a computer software company with offices in the United States and headquarters established in Lowell, Massachusetts. SofTech was a significant provider of software engineering tools and solutions in the 1970s, as well as services related to product lifecycle management, product data management, computer-aided design and computer-aided manufacturing. SofTech was founded by Douglas T. Ross, and was acquired by Essig PLM.
