= SIPOC =

Process improvement

In process improvement, SIPOC or suppliers, inputs, process, outputs and customers (sometimes in the reversed order: COPIS) is a tool that summarizes the inputs and outputs of one or more business processes in table form, with each of the words forming a column in the table used in the analysis. It is used to define a business process from beginning to end before work on process improvement begins.

== History ==
It was in use at least as early as the total quality management programs of the late 1980s (Note: The SIPOC is a simplification of a tool that author and quality guru, Philip Crosby called a Process Model. The Process Model had additional parts, but the center of the process model was in fact a SIPOC. For example, compare the steps in preparing a SIPOC with the "Xerox Quality Improvement Process" presented in Kearns, David T.; Nadler, David A. (1992). "Appendix 7". Prophets in the Dark: How Xerox Reinvented Itself and Beat Back the Japanese. New York: HarperCollins. p. 318. ISBN 9780887305641. OCLC 25283632.) and continues to be used today in Six Sigma, lean manufacturing, and business process management.

== COPIS variant ==
To emphasize putting the needs of the customer foremost, the tool is sometimes called COPIS and the process information is filled out in reverse order by starting with the customer and working upstream to the supplier.

== Use ==
The SIPOC is often presented at the outset of process improvement efforts such as kaizen events or during the "define" phase of the DMAIC process. It has three typical uses depending on the audience:

- To give people who are unfamiliar with a process a high-level overview
- To reacquaint people whose familiarity with a process has faded or become out-of-date due to process changes
- To help people in defining a new process

=== Aspects ===
Several aspects of the SIPOC that may not be readily apparent are:

- Suppliers and customers may be internal or external to the organization that performs the process.
- Inputs and outputs may be materials, services, or information.
- The focus is on capturing the set of inputs and outputs rather than the individual steps in the process. (Note: The capture of individual process steps in detail is the focus of business process mapping.)

=== Mapping ===
To create a SIPOC diagram, one must first map the overall process in a few steps. Then one must identify process outputs, who will receive them, and what the necessary inputs and suppliers are for each process. The final step is to share the diagram with the stakeholders to evaluate and verify the results.

== Example ==
Example SIPOC: Automobile repair
Supplier	Input	Process	Output	Customer
Vehicle owner; Customer service representative; Facility manager; Parts window	Repair inquiry; Vehicle for repair; Permission to proceed with individual recommendations; Open bay; Parts for approved repairs; Observations	Schedule visit; Diagnose problem; Prepare work order; Source parts; Perform repairs; Notify that service is complete	Appointment date and time; Repair recommendations and cost estimates; Work order; Parts for approved repairs; Repaired vehicle; Telephone/e-mail/text message notification	Vehicle owner; Mechanic; Customer service representative

== See also ==
- Input–process–output (IPO) model
- 5 whys
- Value stream mapping
- IDEF, a functional modelling language
