= Richard J. Mayer =

American computer scientist

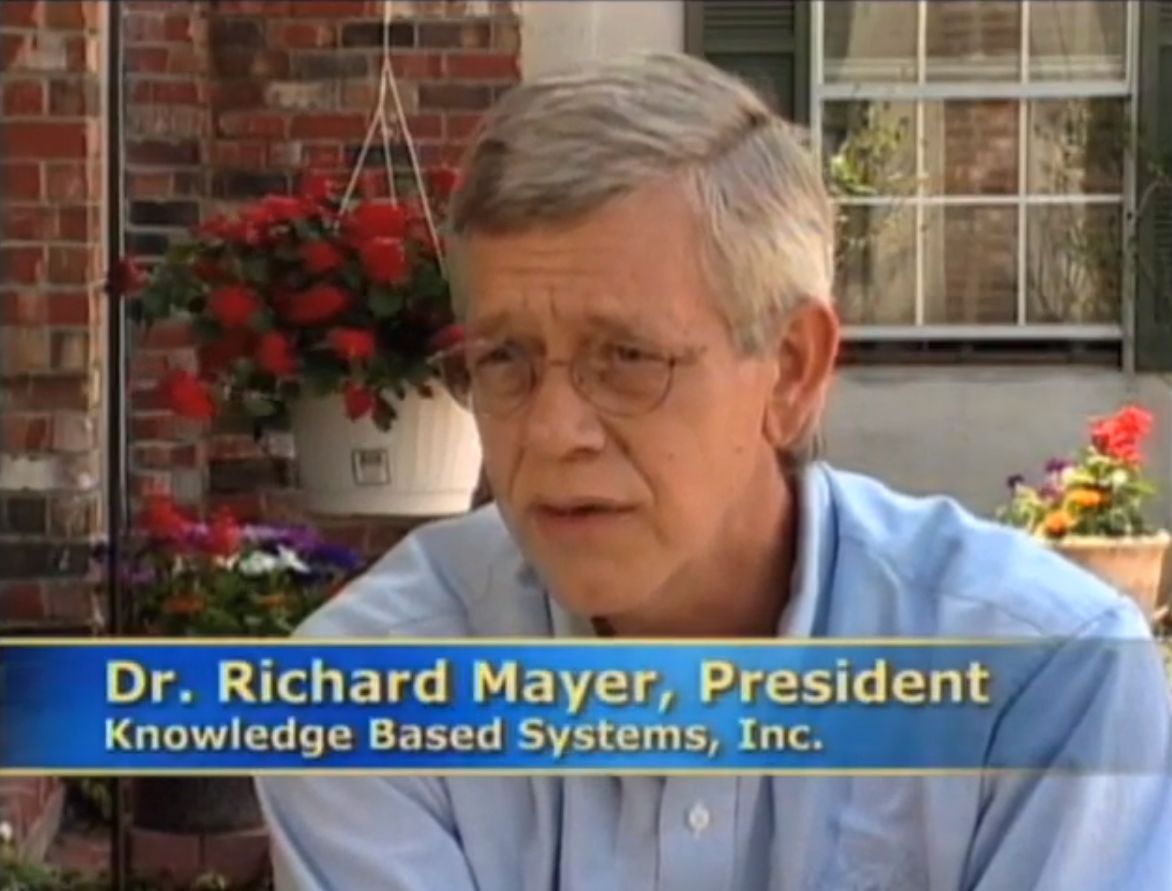
Dr. Richard Mayer, President Knowledge Based Systems, Inc., 2013

Richard J. Mayer (born 1952) is an American engineer, President of Knowledge Based Systems, Inc., known as lead engineer and principal investigator on the projects of developing part of the IDEF family of modeling languages in the field of software and systems engineering.

Mayer received a PhD and worked for years at the Texas A&M University, College Station, TX. He was the lead engineer during the development of the information and data modeling methods IDEF1 and IDEF1X while at Wright Patterson Air Force Base. In 1988 he cofounded Knowledge Based Systems, Inc. (KBSI), College Station, Texas. KBSI was the prime contractor for the Information Integration for Concurrent Engineering (IICE) project, funded by Armstrong Laboratory, Logistics Research Division, Wright-Patterson Air Force Base, Ohio. Richard J. Mayer was the Principal Investigator on the projects of developing IDEF3, IDEF4 en IDEF6.

== Publications ==
Mayer has published several books and articles. A selection:

- 1990. Conflict management : the courage to confront. Columbus, Ohio : Battelle Press. ISBN 0-935470-51-4
- 1991. IDEF6: A Design Rationale Capture Method Concept Paper With Patricia A. Griffith & Christopher P. Menzel. Defense Technical Information Center.
- 1992. IDEF4 object-oriented design method report. Armstrong Laboratory, Air Force Systems Command.
- 1993. Information Integration for Concurrent Engineering (IICE): IDEF3 Process Description Capture Method Report . Logistics Research Division, Wright-Patterson AFB, OH 45433
- 1995. Information Integration for Concurrent Engineering (IICE) Compendium of methods report . Wright-Patterson Air Force Base, Ohio 45433-7604.
