= Weak entity =

A type of item in a relational database, in computing

In a relational database, a weak entity is an entity that cannot be uniquely identified by its attributes alone; therefore, it must use a foreign key in conjunction with its attributes to create a primary key. The foreign key is typically a primary key of an entity it is related to.

The foreign key is an attribute of the identifying (or owner, parent, or dominant) entity set. Each element in the weak entity set must have a relationship with exactly one element in the owner entity set, and therefore, the relationship cannot be a many-to-many relationship.

Two entities can be associated without either being classified as weak, even if one depends on the other, as long as each has its own unique attribute. For instance, a person entity can be linked to a car without one of them being considered as weak entity.

In entity relationship diagrams (ER diagrams), a weak entity set is indicated by a bold (or double-lined) rectangle (the entity) connected by a bold (or double-lined) type arrow to a bold (or double-lined) diamond (the relationship). This type of relationship is called an identifying relationship and in IDEF1X notation it is represented by an oval entity rather than a square entity for base tables. An identifying relationship is one where the primary key is populated to the child weak entity as a primary key in that entity.

In general (though not necessarily) a weak entity does not have any items in its primary key other than its inherited primary key and a sequence number. There are two types of weak entities: associative entities and subtype entities. The latter represents a crucial type of normalization, where the super-type entity inherits its attributes to subtype entities based on the value of the discriminator.

In IDEF1X, a government standard for capturing requirements, possible sub-type relationships are:

- Complete subtype relationship, when all categories are known.
- Incomplete subtype relationship, when all categories may not be known.

A classic example of a weak entity without a sub-type relationship would be the "header/detail' records in many real world situations such as claims, orders and invoices, where the header captures information common across all forms and the detail captures information specific to individual items.

The standard example of a complete subtype relationship is the party entity. Given the discriminator PARTY TYPE (which could be individual, partnership, C Corporation, Sub Chapter S Association, Association, Governmental Unit, Quasi-governmental agency) the two subtype entities are PERSON, which contains individual-specific information such as first and last name and date of birth, and ORGANIZATION, which would contain such attributes as the legal name, and organizational hierarchies such as cost centers.

When sub-type relationships are rendered in a database, the super-type becomes what is referred to as a base table. The sub-types are considered derived tables, which correspond to weak entities. Referential integrity is enforced via cascading updates and deletes.

== Example ==
Consider a database that records customer orders, where an order is for one or more of the items that the enterprise sells. The database would contain a table identifying customers by a customer number (primary key); another identifying the products that can be sold by a product number (primary key); and it would contain a pair of tables describing orders.

One of the tables could be called Orders and it would have an order number (primary key) to identify this order uniquely, and would contain a customer number (foreign key) to identify who the products are being sold to, plus other information such as the date and time when the order was placed, how it will be paid for, where it is to be shipped to, and so on.

The other table could be called OrderItem; it would be identified by a compound key consisting of both the order number (foreign key) and an item line number; with other non-primary key attributes such as the product number (foreign key) that was ordered, the quantity, the price, any discount, any special options, and so on. There may be zero, one or many OrderItem entries corresponding to an Order entry, but no OrderItem entry can exist unless the corresponding Order entry exists. (The zero OrderItem case normally only applies transiently, when the order is first entered and before the first ordered item has been recorded.)

The OrderItem table stores weak entities precisely because an OrderItem has no meaning independent of the Order. Some might argue that an OrderItem does have some meaning on its own; it records that at some time not identified by the record, somebody not identified by the record ordered a certain quantity of a certain product. This information might be of some use on its own, but it is of limited use. For example, as soon as you want to find seasonal or geographical trends in the sales of the item, you need information from the related Order record.

An order would not exist without a product and a person to create the order, so it could be argued that an order would be described as a weak entity and that products ordered would be a multivalue attribute of the order.

== See also ==
- Associative entity
