= IDEF0 =

Function modeling methodology for describing manufacturing functions

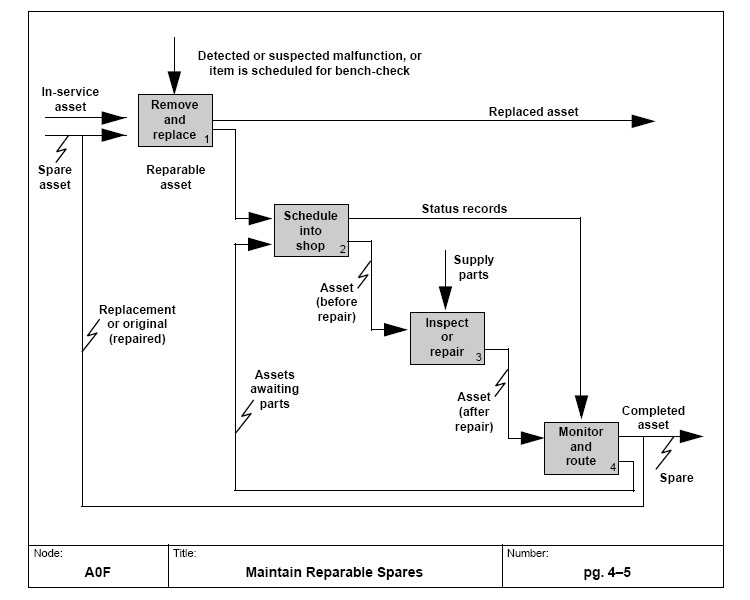
IDEF0 Diagram Example

IDEF0 (ICAM Definition for Function Modeling; where ICAM is Integrated Computer-Aided Manufacturing) is a function modeling methodology for describing manufacturing functions, which offers a functional modeling language for the analysis, development, reengineering and integration of information systems, business processes or software engineering analysis.

IDEF0 is part of the IDEF family of modeling languages in the field of software engineering, and is built on the functional modeling language Structured Analysis and Design Technique (SADT).

== Overview ==
The IDEF0 Functional Modeling method is designed to model the decisions, actions, and activities of an organization or system. It was derived from the established graphic modeling language Structured Analysis and Design Technique (SADT) developed by Douglas T. Ross and SofTech, Inc. In its original form, IDEF0 includes both a definition of a graphical modeling language (syntax and semantics) and a description of a comprehensive methodology for developing models. The US Air Force commissioned the SADT developers "to develop a function model method for analyzing and communicating the functional perspective of a system. IDEF0 should assist in organizing system analysis and promote effective communication between the analyst and the customer through simplified graphical devices".

Where the Functional flow block diagram is used to show the functional flow of a product, IDEF0 is used to show data flow, system control, and the functional flow of lifecycle processes. IDEF0 is capable of graphically representing a wide variety of business, manufacturing and other types of enterprise operations to any level of detail. It provides rigorous and precise description, and promotes consistency of usage and interpretation. It is well-tested and proven through many years of use by government and private industry. It can be generated by a variety of computer graphics tools. Numerous commercial products specifically support development and analysis of IDEF0 diagrams and models.

An associated technique, Integration Definition for Information Modeling (IDEF1x), is used to supplement IDEF0 for data-intensive systems. The IDEF0 standard, Federal Information Processing Standards Publication 183 (FIPS 183), and the IDEF1x standard (FIPS 184) are maintained by the National Institute of Standards and Technology (NIST).

FIPS PUB 183 "Integration Definition for Function Modeling (IDEF0)," was withdrawn as a Federal Standard (in favor of OPEN Specifications and Standards) September 2, 2008, as cited in "The Federal Register", Volume 73, page 51276 (73FR/51276).

== History ==
During the 1970s, the U.S. Air Force Program for Integrated Computer Aided Manufacturing (ICAM) sought to increase manufacturing productivity through systematic application of computer technology. The ICAM program identified the need for better analysis and communication techniques for people involved in improving manufacturing productivity. As a result, in 1981 the ICAM program developed a series of techniques known as the IDEF (ICAM Definition) techniques which included the following:

- IDEF0, used to produce a "function model". A function model is a structured representation of the functions, activities or processes within the modeled system or subject area.
- IDEF1, used to produce an "information model". An information model represents the structure and semantics of information within the modeled system or subject area.
- IDEF2, used to produce a "dynamics model". A dynamics model represents the time-varying behavioral characteristics of the modeled system or subject area.

In 1983, the U.S. Air Force Integrated Information Support System program enhanced the IDEF1 information modeling technique to form IDEF1X (IDEF1 Extended), a semantic data modeling technique. By the 1990s, IDEF0 and IDEF1X techniques are widely used in the government, industrial and commercial sectors, supporting modeling efforts for a wide range of enterprises and application domains. In 1991 the National Institute of Standards and Technology (NIST) received support from the U.S. Department of Defense, Office of Corporate Information Management (DoD/CIM), to develop one or more Federal Information Processing Standard (FIPS) for modeling techniques. The techniques selected were IDEF0 for function modeling and IDEF1X for information modeling. These FIPS documents are based on the IDEF manuals published by the U.S. Air Force in the early 1980s. Sometime later, IEEE created the IDEF0 standard, and ISO adopted and published it as IEEE/ISO/IEC 31320-1.

== IDEF0 topics ==
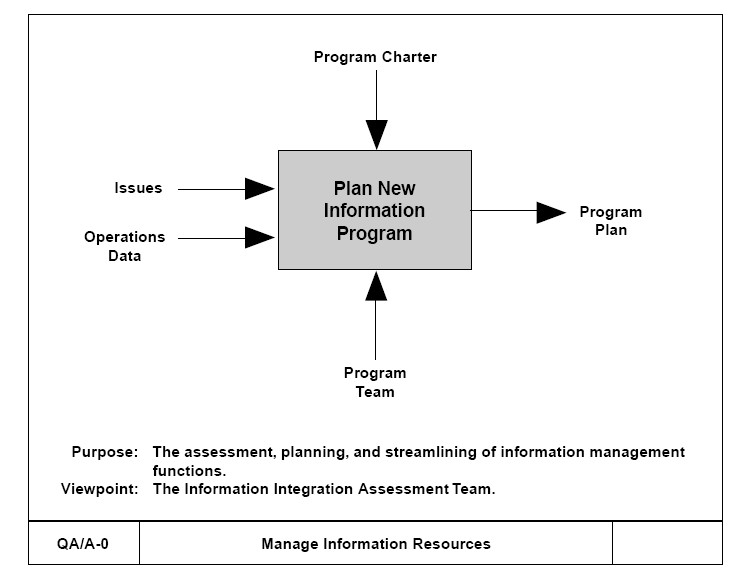
Top-Level Context Diagram

=== The IDEF0 approach ===
IDEF0 may be used to model a wide variety of automated and non-automated systems. For new systems, it may be used first to define the requirements and specify the functions, and then to design an implementation that meets the requirements and performs the functions. For existing systems, IDEF0 can be used to analyze the functions the system performs and to record the mechanisms (means) by which these are done. The result of applying IDEF0 to a system is a model that consists of a hierarchical series of diagrams, text, and glossary cross-referenced to each other. The two primary modeling components are functions (represented on a diagram by boxes) and the data and objects that inter-relate those functions (represented by arrows).

=== IDEF0 Building blocks ===
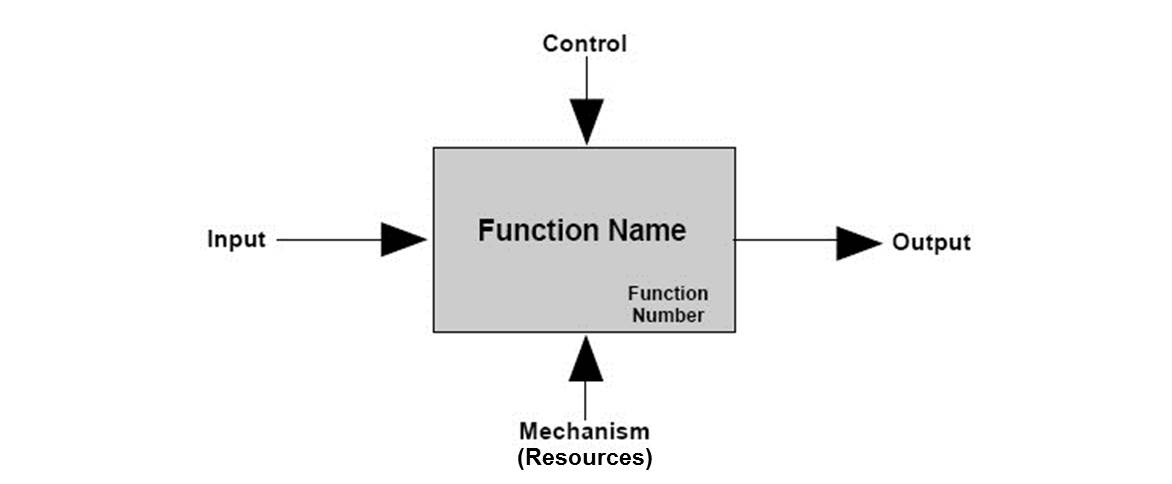
Integration Definition for Function Modeling (IDEF0) Box Format

The IDEF0 model displayed here on the left is based on a simple syntax. Each activity is described by a verb-based label placed in a box. Inputs are shown as arrows entering the left side of the activity box while output are shown as exiting arrows on the right side of the box. Controls are displayed as arrows entering the top of the box and mechanisms are displayed as arrows entering from the bottom of the box. Inputs, Controls, Outputs, and Mechanisms (ICOM) are all referred to as concepts.

- Arrow : A directed line, composed of one or more arrow segments, that models an open channel or conduit conveying data or objects from source (no arrowhead) to use (with arrowhead). There are 4 arrow classes: Input Arrow, Output Arrow, Control Arrow, and Mechanism Arrow (includes Call Arrow). See Arrow Segment, Boundary Arrow, Internal Arrow.
- Box : A rectangle, containing a name and number, used to represent a function.
Box Syntax

Arrow Syntax

Arrow Positions and Roles

Label and Name Semantics
- Context : The immediate environment in which a function (or set of functions on a diagram) operates.
- Decomposition : The partitioning of a modeled function into its component functions.
Example Top-level Diagram

Decomposition Structure

Detail Reference Expression Use

Arrow Fork and Join Structures
- Fork : The junction at which an IDEF0 arrow segment (going from source to use) divides into two or more arrow segments. May denote unbundling of meaning.
Connections Between Boxes

Boundary and Internal Arrows

Typical Node Tree

Negative Node-Numbered Context
- Function : An activity, process, or transformation (modeled by an IDEF0 box) identified by a verb or verb phrase that describes what must be accomplished.
- Join : The junction at which an IDEF0 arrow segment (going from source to use) merges with one or more other arrow segments to form a single arrow segment. May denote bundling of arrow segment meanings
- Node : A box from which child boxes originate; a parent box. See Node Index, Node Tree, Node Number, Node Reference, Diagram Node Number.

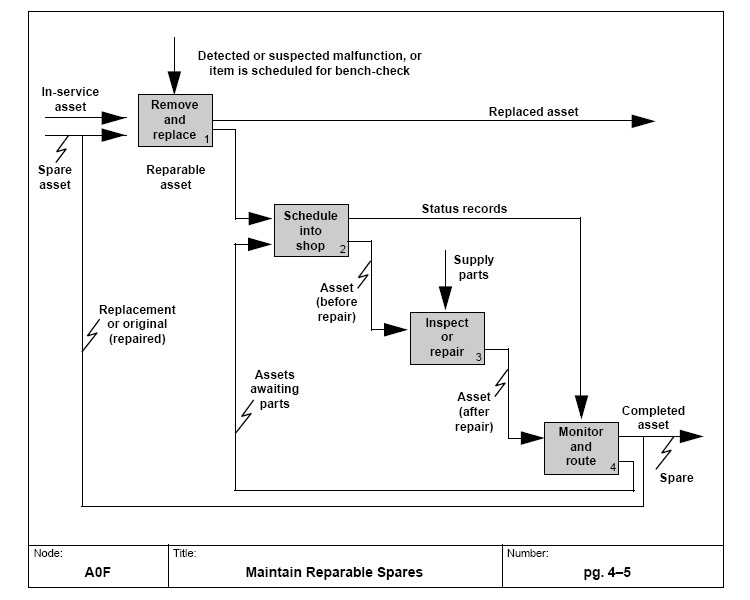
IDEF0 Diagram Example

=== Graphical notation ===
IDEF0 is a model that consists of a hierarchical series of diagrams, text, and glossary cross referenced to each other. The two primary modeling components are:

- functions (represented on a diagram by boxes), and
- data and objects that interrelate those functions (represented by arrows).

As shown by Figure 3 the position at which the arrow attaches to a box conveys the specific role of the interface. The controls enter the top of the box. The inputs, the data or objects acted upon by the operation, enter the box from the left. The outputs of the operation leave the right-hand side of the box. Mechanism arrows that provide supporting means for performing the function join (point up to) the bottom of the box.

=== The IDEF0 process ===
The IDEF0 process starts with the identification of the prime function to be decomposed. This function is identified on a “Top Level Context Diagram,” that defines the scope of the particular IDEF0 analysis. An example of a Top Level Context Diagram for an information system management process is shown in Figure 3. From this diagram lower-level diagrams are generated. An example of a derived diagram, called a “child” in IDEF0 terminology, for a life cycle function is shown in Figure 4.

=== Federal Information Processing Standards ===
In Dec 1993 the National Institute of Standards and Technology announcing the standard for Integration Definition for Function Modeling (IDEF0) in the category Software Standard, Modeling Techniques. This publication announces the adoption of the IDEF0 as a Federal Information Processing Standard (FIPS). This standard was based on the Air Force Wright Aeronautical Laboratories Integrated Computer-Aided Manufacturing (ICAM) Architecture from June 1981.

On September 2, 2008, the associated NIST standard, FIPS 183, has been withdrawn (decision on Federal Register vol. 73 / page 51276.

== See also ==
- Function model
- Functional flow block diagram
- IDEF1X
- IDEF3
- IDEF5
