= Integrated Computer-Aided Manufacturing =

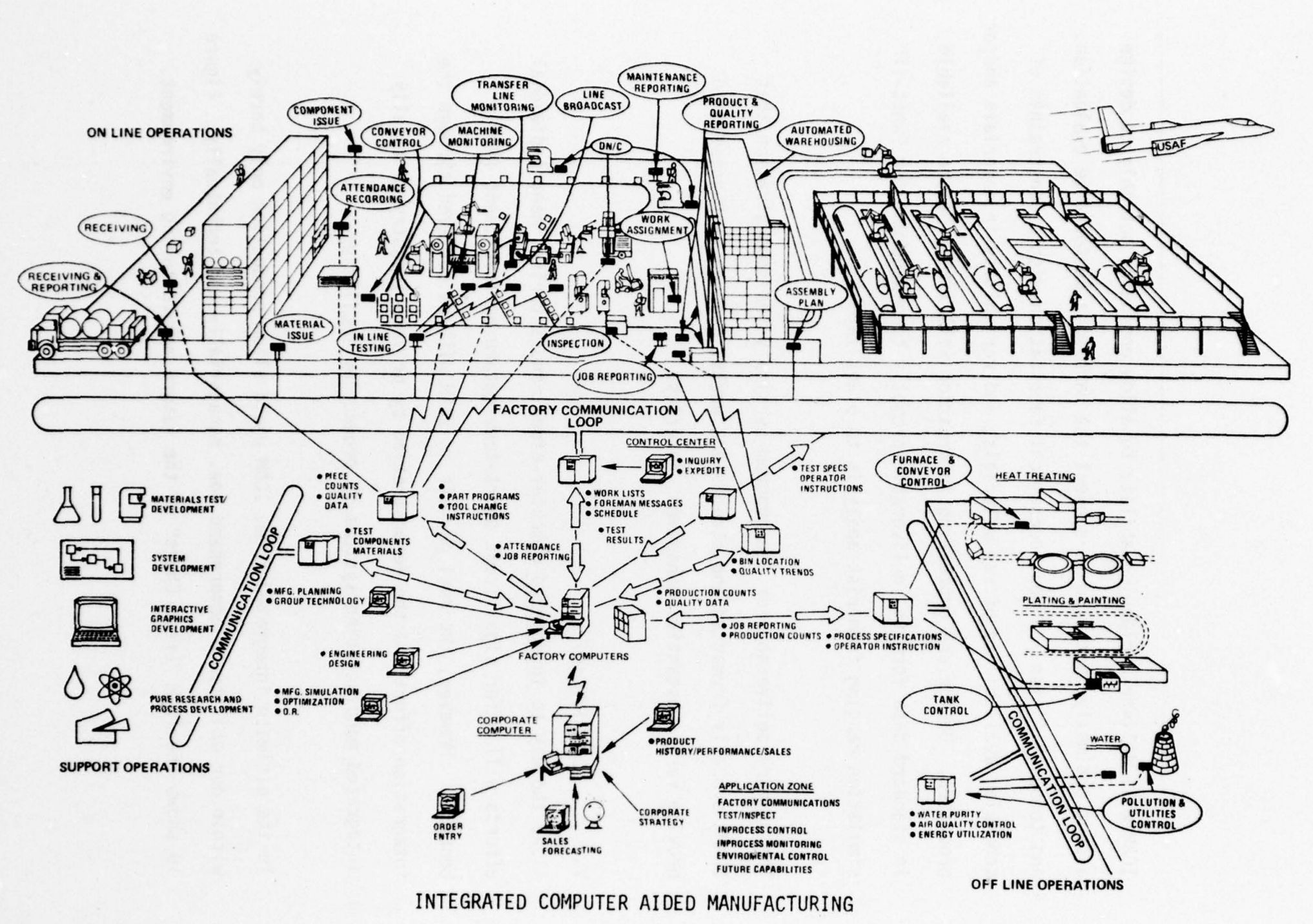
Online operations and support operations in an Integrated Computer Aided Manufacturing environment, 1977

Integrated Computer-Aided Manufacturing (ICAM) is a US Air Force program that develops tools, techniques, and processes to support manufacturing integration. It influenced the computer-integrated manufacturing (CIM) and computer-aided manufacturing (CAM) project efforts of many companies. The ICAM program was founded in 1976 and initiative managed by the US Air Force at Wright-Patterson as a part of their technology modernization efforts. The program initiated the development a series of standards for modeling and analysis in management and business improvement, called Integrated Definitions, short IDEFs.

== Overview ==
The USAF ICAM program was founded in 1976 at the US Air Force Materials Laboratory, Wright-Patterson Air Force Base in Ohio by Dennis E. Wisnosky and Dan L. Shunk and others. In the mid-1970s Joseph Harrington had assisted Wisnosky and Shunk in designing the ICAM program and had broadened the concept of CIM to include the entire manufacturing company. Harrington considered manufacturing a "monolithic function".

The ICAM program was visionary in showing that a new approach was necessary to achieve integration in manufacturing firms. Wisnosky and Shunk developed a "wheel" to illustrate the architecture of their ICAM project and to show the various elements that had to work together. Wisnosky and Shunk were among the first to understand the web of interdependencies needed for integration. Their work represents the first major step in shifting the focus of manufacturing from a series of sequential operations to parallel processing.

The ICAM program has spent over $100 million to develop tools, techniques, and processes to support manufacturing integration. The Air Force's ICAM program recognizes the role of data as central to any integration effort. Data must be common and shareable across functions. The concept still remains ahead of its time, because most major companies did not seriously begin to attack the data architecture challenge until well into the 1990s. The ICAM program also recognizes the need for ways to analyze and document major activities within the manufacturing establishment. Thus, from ICAM came the IDEFs, the standard for modeling and analysis in management and business improvement efforts. IDEF means ICAM DEFinition.

== The impact ==
Overview of the IDEF methods developed in the ICAM program.

=== Standard data models ===
To extract real meaning from the data, we must also have formulated, and agreed on, a model of the world the data describes. We now understand that this actually involves two different kinds of model:

- Static associations between data and real-world physical and conceptual objects it describes—called the information model
- Rules for use and modification of the data, which derive from the dynamic characteristics of the objects themselves—called the functional model

The significance of these models to data interchange for manufacturing and materials flow was recognized early in the Air Force Integrated Computer Aided Manufacturing (ICAM) Project and gave rise to the IDEF formal modeling project. IDEF produced a specification for a formal functional modeling approach (IDEF0) and an information modeling language (IDEF1). The more recent "Product Data Exchange Specification" (PDES) project in the U.S., the related ISO Standard for the exchange of product model data (STEP) and the Computer Integrated Manufacture Open Systems Architecture (CIMOSA) [ISO87] project in the European Economic Community have whole heartedly accepted the notion that useful data sharing is not possible without formal semantic data models of the context the data describes.

Within their respective spectra of efforts, each of these projects has a panoply of information models for manufactured objects, materials and product characteristics, and for manufacturing and assembly processes. Each also has a commitment to detailed functional models of the various phases of product life cycle. The object of all of these recent efforts is to standardize the interchange of information in many aspects of product design, manufacture, delivery and support.

=== Further research with ICAM definitions ===
The research in expending and applying the ICAM definitions have proceeded. In the 1990s for example the Material Handling Research Center (MHRC) of the Georgia Institute of Technology and University of Arkansas had included it in their Information Systems research area. That area focuses on the information that must accompany material movements and the application of artificial intelligence to material handling problems. MHRC's research involves expanding the integrated computer-aided manufacturing definition (IDEF) approach to include the information flow as well as the material flow needed to support a manufacturing enterprise, as well as models to handle unscheduled events such as machine breakdowns or material shortages. Past research resulted in software to automatically palletize random-size packages, a system to automatically load and unload truck trailers, and an integrated production control system to fabricate optical fibers.

== See also ==
- CIMOSA
- IDEF
