= IDEF =

Family of modeling languages

IDEF methods: part of the systems engineer's toolbox

IDEF, initially an abbreviation of ICAM Definition and renamed in 1999 as Integration Definition, is a family of modeling languages in the field of systems and software engineering. They cover a wide range of uses from functional modeling to data, simulation, object-oriented analysis and design, and knowledge acquisition. These definition languages were developed under funding from U.S. Air Force and, although still most commonly used by them and other military and United States Department of Defense (DoD) agencies, are in the public domain.

The most-widely recognized and used components of the IDEF family are IDEF0, a functional modeling language building on SADT, and IDEF1X, which addresses information models and database design issues.

== Overview of IDEF methods ==
IDEF refers to a family of modeling language, which cover a wide range of uses, from functional modeling to data, simulation, object-oriented analysis/design and knowledge acquisition. Eventually the IDEF methods have been defined up to IDEF14:

- IDEF0: Function modeling
- IDEF1: Information modeling
- IDEF1X: Data modeling
- IDEF2: Simulation model design
- IDEF3: Process description capture
- IDEF4: Object-oriented design
- IDEF5: Ontology description capture
- IDEF6: Design rationale capture
- IDEF7: Information system auditing
- IDEF8: User interface modeling
- IDEF9: Business constraint discovery
- IDEF10: Implementation architecture modeling
- IDEF11: Information artifact modeling
- IDEF12: Organization modeling
- IDEF13: Three-schema mapping design
- IDEF14: Network design

In 1995 only the IDEF0, IDEF1X, IDEF2, IDEF3 and IDEF4 had been developed in full. Some of the other IDEF concepts had some preliminary design. Some of the last efforts were new IDEF developments in 1995 toward establishing reliable methods for business constraint discovery IDEF9, design rationale capture IDEF6, human system, interaction design IDEF8, and network design IDEF14.

The methods IDEF7, IDEF10, IDEF11, IDEF 12 and IDEF13 haven't been developed any further than their initial definition.

== History ==
IDEF originally stood for ICAM Definition, initiated in the 1970s at the US Air Force Materials Laboratory, Wright-Patterson Air Force Base in Ohio by Dennis E. Wisnosky, Dan L. Shunk, and others. and completed in the 1980s. IDEF was a product of the ICAM initiative of the United States Air Force. The IEEE recast the IDEF abbreviation as Integration Definition."

The specific projects that produced IDEF were ICAM project priorities 111 and 112 (later renumbered 1102). The subsequent Integrated Information Support System (IISS) project priorities 6201, 6202, and 6203 attempted to create an information processing environment that could be run in heterogeneous physical computing environments. Further development of IDEF occurred under those projects as a result of the experience gained from applications of the new modeling techniques. The intent of the IISS efforts was to create 'generic subsystems' that could be used by a large number of collaborating enterprises, such as U.S. defense contractors and the armed forces of friendly nations.

At the time of the ICAM 1102 effort there were numerous, mostly incompatible, data model methods for storing computer data — sequential (VSAM), hierarchical (IMS), network (Cincom's TOTAL and CODASYL, and Cullinet's IDMS). The relational data model was just emerging as a promising way of thinking about structuring data for easy, efficient, and accurate access. Relational database management systems had not yet emerged as a general standard for data management.

The ICAM program office deemed it valuable to create a "neutral" way of describing the data content of large-scale systems. The emerging academic literature suggested that methods were needed to process data independently of the way it was physically stored. Thus the IDEF1 language was created to allow a neutral description of data structures that could be applied regardless of the storage method or file access method.

IDEF1 was developed under ICAM program priority 1102 by Robert R. Brown of the Hughes Aircraft Company, under contract to SofTech, Inc. Brown had previously been responsible for the development of IMS while working at Rockwell International. Rockwell chose not to pursue IMS as a marketable product but IBM, which had served as a support contractor during development, subsequently took over the product and was successful in further developing it for market. Brown credits his Hughes colleague Timothy Ramey as the inventor of IDEF1 as a viable formalism for modeling information structures. The two Hughes researchers built on ideas from and interactions with many luminaries in the field at the time. In particular, IDEF1 draws on the following techniques:

- the evolving natural language information model (ENALIM) technique of G. M. Nijssen (Control Data Corporation) — this technique is now more widely known as NIAM or the object–role model ORM;
- the network data structures technique, popularly called the CODASYL approach, of Charles Bachman (Honeywell Information Systems);
- the hierarchical data management technique, implemented in IBM's IMS data management system, developed by R. R. Brown (Rockwell International);
- the relational approach to data of E. F. Codd (IBM);
- The entity–relationship approach (E–R) of Peter Chen (UCLA).

The effort to develop IDEF1 resulted in both a new method for information modeling and an example of its use in the form of a "reference information model of manufacturing." This latter artifact was developed by D. S. Coleman of the D. Appleton Company (DACOM) acting as a sub-contractor to Hughes and under the direction of Ramey. Personnel at DACOM became expert at IDEF1 modeling and subsequently produced a training course and accompanying materials for the IDEF1 modeling technique.

Experience with IDEF1 revealed that the translation of information requirements into database designs was more difficult than had originally been anticipated. The most beneficial value of the IDEF1 information modeling technique was its ability to represent data independent of how those data were to be stored and used. It provided data modelers and data analysts with a way to represent data requirements during the requirements-gathering process. This allowed designers to decide which DBMS to use after the nature of the data requirements was understood and thus reduced the "misfit" between data requirements and the capabilities and limitations of the DBMS. The translation of IDEF1 models to database designs, however, proved to be difficult.

== The IDEF modeling languages ==
=== IDEF0 ===
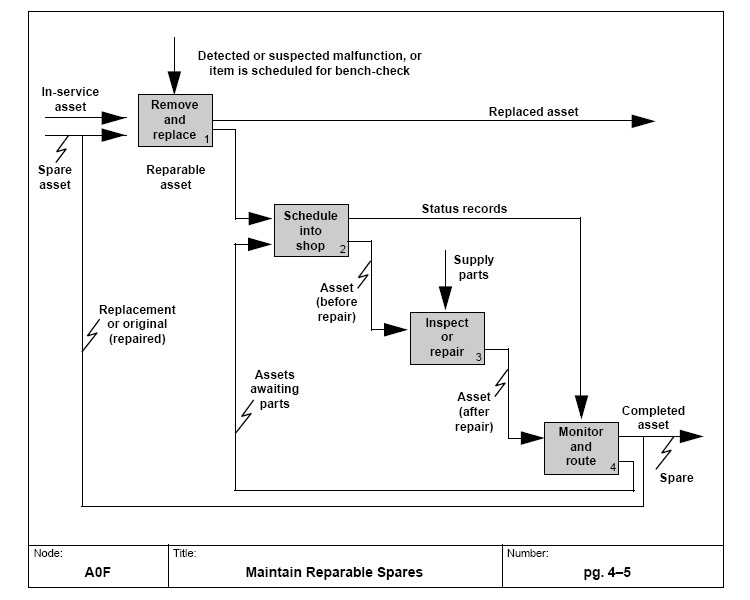
Example of an IDEF0 diagram: a function model of the process of maintaining reparable spares

The IDEF0 functional modeling method is designed to model the decisions, actions, and activities of an organization or system. It was derived from the established graphic modeling language structured analysis and design technique (SADT) developed by Douglas T. Ross and SofTech, Inc. In its original form, IDEF0 includes both a definition of a graphical modeling language (syntax and semantics) and a description of a comprehensive methodology for developing models. The US Air Force commissioned the SADT developers to develop a function model method for analyzing and communicating the functional perspective of a system. IDEF0 should assist in organizing system analysis and promote effective communication between the analyst and the customer through simplified graphical devices.

=== IDEF1X ===
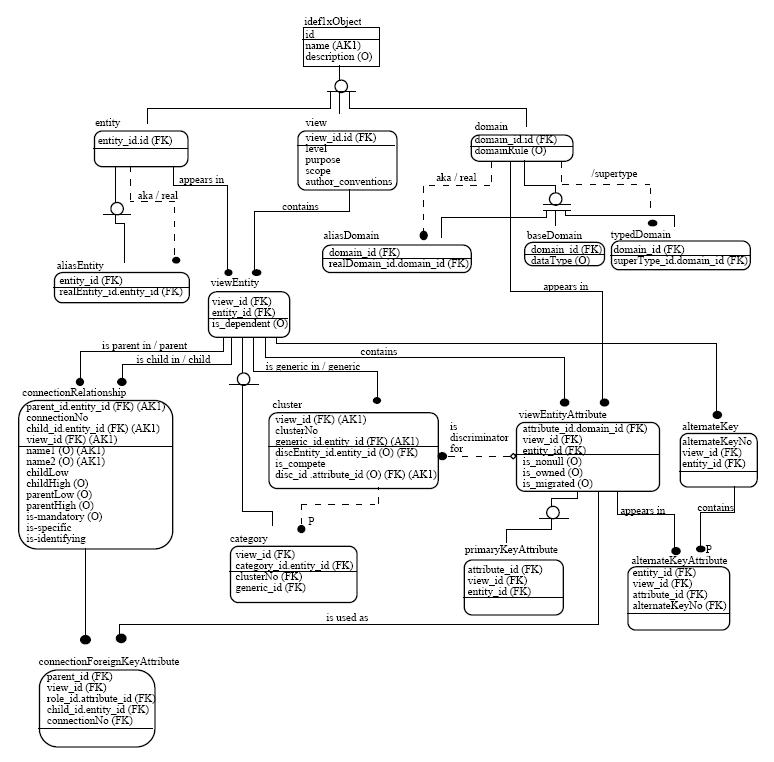
Example of an IDEF1X diagram

To satisfy the data modeling enhancement requirements that were identified in the IISS-6202 project, a sub-contractor, DACOM, obtained a license to the logical database design technique (LDDT) and its supporting software (ADAM). LDDT had been developed in 1982 by Robert G. Brown of The Database Design Group entirely outside the IDEF program and with no knowledge of IDEF1. LDDT combined elements of the relational data model, the E–R model, and generalization in a way specifically intended to support data modeling and the transformation of the data models into database designs. The graphic syntax of LDDT differed from that of IDEF1 and, more importantly, LDDT contained interrelated modeling concepts not present in IDEF1. Mary E. Loomis wrote a concise summary of the syntax and semantics of a substantial subset of LDDT, using terminology compatible with IDEF1 wherever possible. DACOM labeled the result IDEF1X and supplied it to the ICAM program.

Because the IDEF program was funded by the government, the techniques are in the public domain. In addition to the ADAM software, sold by DACOM under the name Leverage, a number of CASE tools use IDEF1X as their representation technique for data modeling.

The IISS projects actually produced working prototypes of an information processing environment that would run in heterogeneous computing environments. Current advancements in such techniques as Java and JDBC are now achieving the goals of ubiquity and versatility across computing environments which was first demonstrated by IISS.

=== IDEF2 and IDEF3 ===
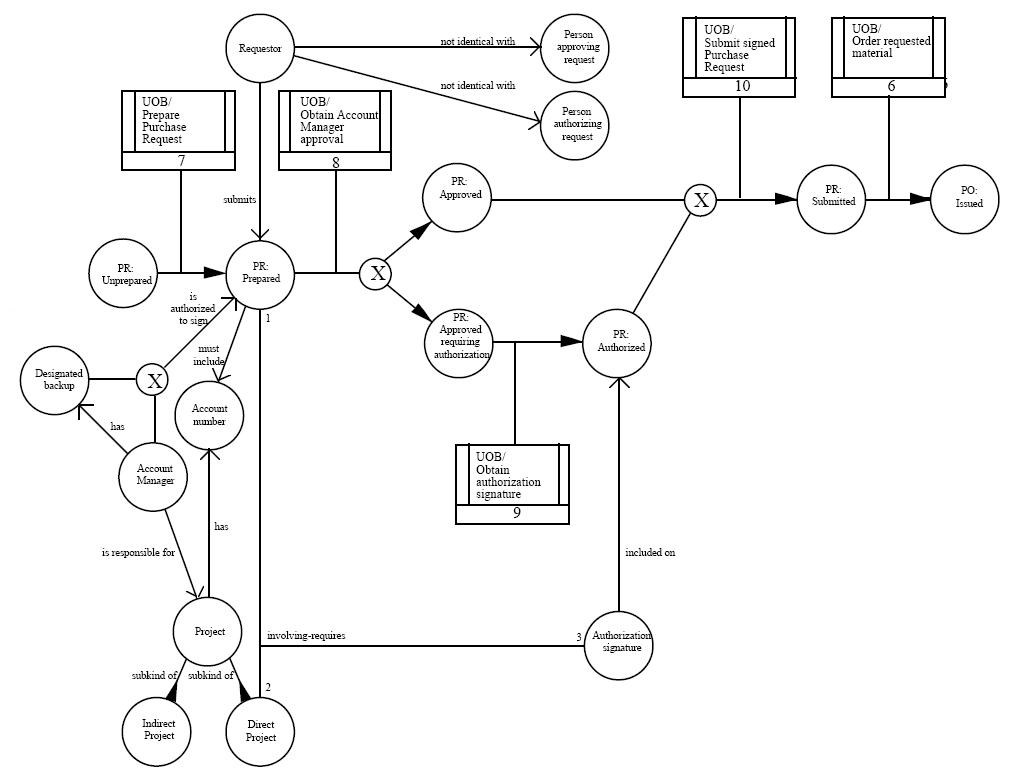
Example of an enhanced transition schematic, modelled with IDEF3

The third IDEF (IDEF2) was originally intended as a user interface modeling method. However, since the Integrated Computer-Aided Manufacturing (ICAM) program needed a simulation modeling tool, the resulting IDEF2 was a method for representing the time varying behavior of resources in a manufacturing system, providing a framework for specification of math model based simulations. It was the intent of the methodology program within ICAM to rectify this situation but limitation of funding did not allow this to happen. As a result, the lack of a method which would support the structuring of descriptions of the user view of a system has been a major shortcoming of the IDEF system. The basic problem from a methodology point of view is the need to distinguish between a description of what a system (existing or proposed) is supposed to do and a representative simulation model that predicts what a system will do. The latter was the focus of IDEF2, the former is the focus of IDEF3.

=== IDEF4 ===
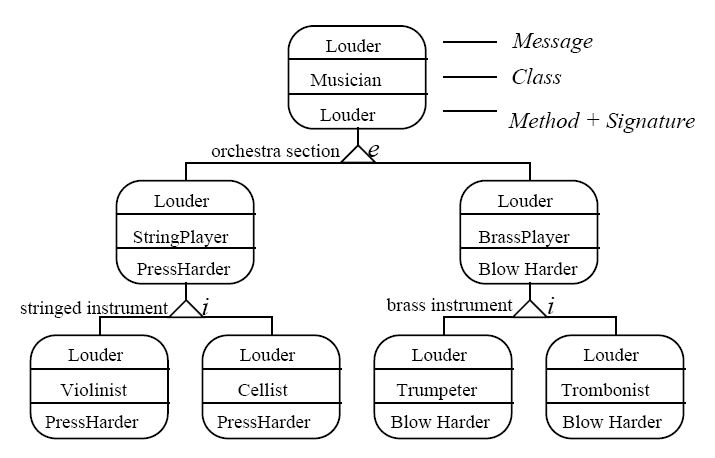
IDEF4 behavior diagram

The development of IDEF4 came from the recognition that the modularity, maintainability and code reusability that results from the object-oriented programming paradigm can be realized in traditional data processing applications. The proven ability of the object-oriented programming paradigm to support data level integration in large complex distributed systems is also a major factor in the widespread interest in this technology from the traditional data processing community.

IDEF4 was developed as a design tool for software designers who use object-oriented languages such as the Common Lisp Object System, Flavors, Smalltalk, Objective-C, C++, and others. Since effective usage of the object-oriented paradigm requires a different thought process than used with conventional procedural or database languages, standard methodologies such as structure charts, data-flow diagrams, and traditional data design models (hierarchical, relational, and network) are not sufficient. IDEF4 seeks to provide the necessary facilities to support the object-oriented design decision making process.

=== IDEF5 ===
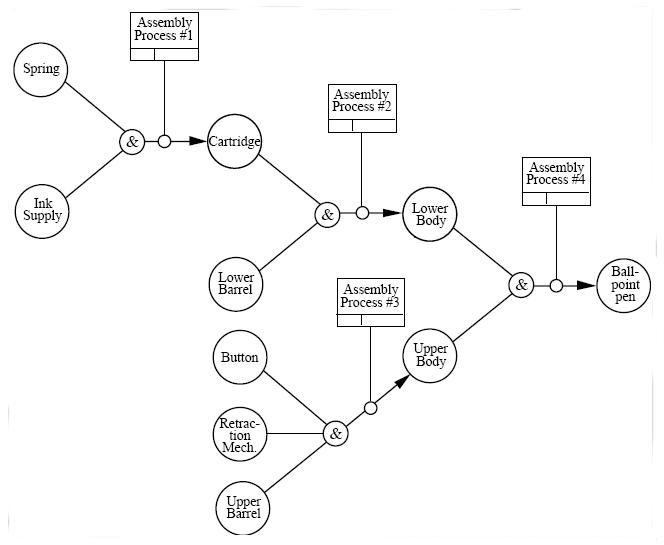
Example of an IDEF5 composition schematic for a ballpoint pen

IDEF5, or integrated definition for ontology description capture method, is a software engineering method to develop and maintain usable, accurate, domain ontologies. In the field of computer science ontologies are used to capture the concept and objects in a specific domain, along with associated relationships and meanings. In addition, ontology capture helps coordinate projects by standardizing terminology and creates opportunities for information reuse. The IDEF5 Ontology Capture Method has been developed to reliably construct ontologies in a way that closely reflects human understanding of the specific domain.

In the IDEF5 method, an ontology is constructed by capturing the content of certain assertions about real-world objects, their properties and their interrelationships, and representing that content in an intuitive and natural form. The IDEF5 method has three main components: A graphical language to support conceptual ontology analysis, a structured text language for detailed ontology characterization, and a systematic procedure that provides guidelines for effective ontology capture.

=== IDEF6 ===
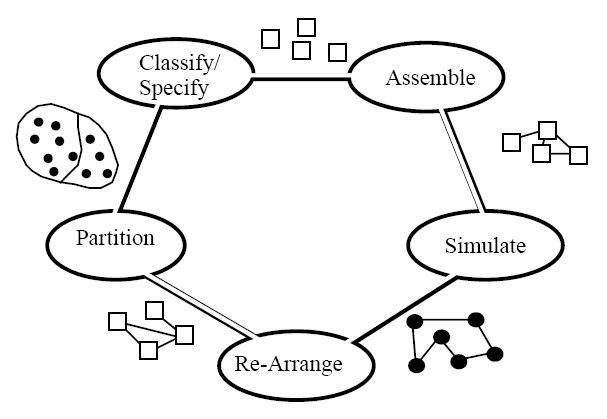
IDEF6 model of IDEF4 design activities

IDEF6, or integrated definition for design rationale capture, is a method to facilitate the acquisition, representation, and manipulation of the design rationale used in the development of enterprise systems. Rationale is the reason, justification, underlying motivation, or excuse that moved the designer to select a particular strategy or design feature. More simply, rationale is interpreted as the answer to the question, “Why is this design being done in this manner?” Most design methods focus on what the design is (i.e. on the final product, rather than why the design is the way it is).

IDEF6 is a method that possesses the conceptual resources and linguistic capabilities needed

1. to represent the nature and structure of the information that constitutes design rationale within a given system, and
2. to associate that rationale with design specifications, models, and documentation for the system.

IDEF6 is applicable to all phases of the information system development process, from initial conceptualization through both preliminary and detailed design activities. To the extent that detailed design decisions for software systems are relegated to the coding phase, the IDEF6 technique should be usable during the software construction process as well.

=== IDEF8 ===
IDEF8, or integrated definition for human-system interaction design, is a method for producing high-quality designs of interactions between users and the systems they operate. Systems are characterized as a collection of objects that perform functions to accomplish a particular goal. The system with which the user interacts can be any system, not necessarily a computer program. Human-system interactions are designed at three levels of specification within the IDEF8 method. The first level defines the philosophy of system operation and produces a set of models and textual descriptions of overall system processes. The second level of design specifies role-centered scenarios of system use. The third level of IDEF8 design is for human-system design detailing. At this level of design, IDEF8 provides a library of metaphors to help users and designers specify the desired behavior in terms of other objects whose behavior is more familiar. Metaphors provide a model of abstract concepts in terms of familiar, concrete objects and experiences.

=== IDEF9 ===
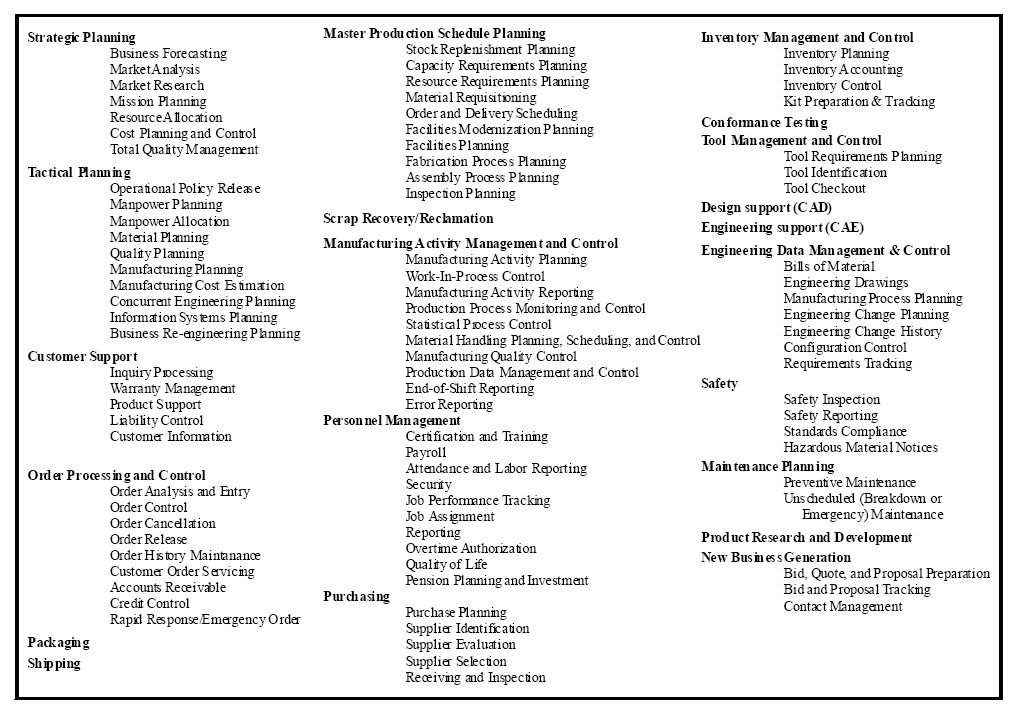
Typical business systems

IDEF9, or integrated definition for business constraint discovery, is designed to assist in the discovery and analysis of constraints in a business system. A primary motivation driving the development of IDEF9 was an acknowledgment that the collection of constraints that forge an enterprise system is generally poorly defined. The knowledge of what constraints exist and how those constraints interact is incomplete, disjoint, distributed, and often completely unknown. Just as living organisms do not need to be aware of the genetic or autonomous constraints that govern certain behaviors, organizations can (and most do) perform well without explicit knowledge of the glue that structures the system. In order to modify business in a predictable manner, however, the knowledge of these constraints is as critical as knowledge of genetics is to the genetic engineer.

=== IDEF14 ===
IDEF14, or integrated definition for network design method, is a method that targets the modeling and design of computer and communication networks. It can be used to model existing ("as is") or envisioned ("to be") networks. It helps the network designer to investigate potential network designs and to document design rationale. The fundamental goals of the IDEF14 research project developed from a perceived need for good network designs that can be implemented quickly and accurately.
