= Ronald Stamper =

British computer scientist (1934–2024)

Ronald Keith Stamper (8 May 1934 – 1 April 2024) was a British computer scientist, formerly a researcher in the LSE and emeritus professor at the University of Twente, known for his pioneering work in Organisational semiotics, and the creation of the MEASUR methodology and the SEDITA framework.

== Background ==
Born in West Bridgford, United Kingdom, Stamper obtained his MA in Mathematics and Statistics at University College Oxford in 1959.

Stamper started his career in industry, first in hospital administration and later in the steel industry. He started applying operational research methods with the use of computers, and evolved into the management of information systems development. In need of more experts, he developed one of the first courses in systems analysis in the UK. In 1969 he moved into the academic world, starting at the London School of Economics as senior lecturer and principal investigator. From 1988 to 1999 he was Professor of Information Management at the University of Twente at its Faculty of Technology and Management. From 2001 to 2004 he was visiting professor at the Staffordshire University.

In 1970s Stamper joined the work of the International Federation for Information Processing (IFIP), and participated in the IFIP TC8/WG8.1 Task Group Design and Evaluation of Information Systems. In the 1990s he made a significant contribution to its 1998 publication of A Framework of Information System Concepts. The FRISCO Report.

Stamper died on 1 April 2024, at the age of 89.

== Work ==
=== Theoretical foundations of information systems ===
The main thrust of Stamper's published work was to find a theoretical foundation for the design and use of computer based information systems. He used a framework provided by semiotics to discuss and prescribe practical and theoretical methods for the design and use of information systems, called the Semiotic Ladder. To the traditional division of semiotics into syntax, semantics and pragmatics, Stamper added "empirics". "Empirics" for Stamper was concerned with the physical properties of sign or signal transmission and storage. He also added a "social" level for shared understanding above the level pragmatics.

Stamper adopted the idea of the sign as the fundamental unit of informatics after his research into the meaning of the word "information" which he considered dangerously polysemous. He was concerned to establish an operationalism at the semantic level of information systems rather than the binary level.

=== LEGally Oriented Language LEGOL ===
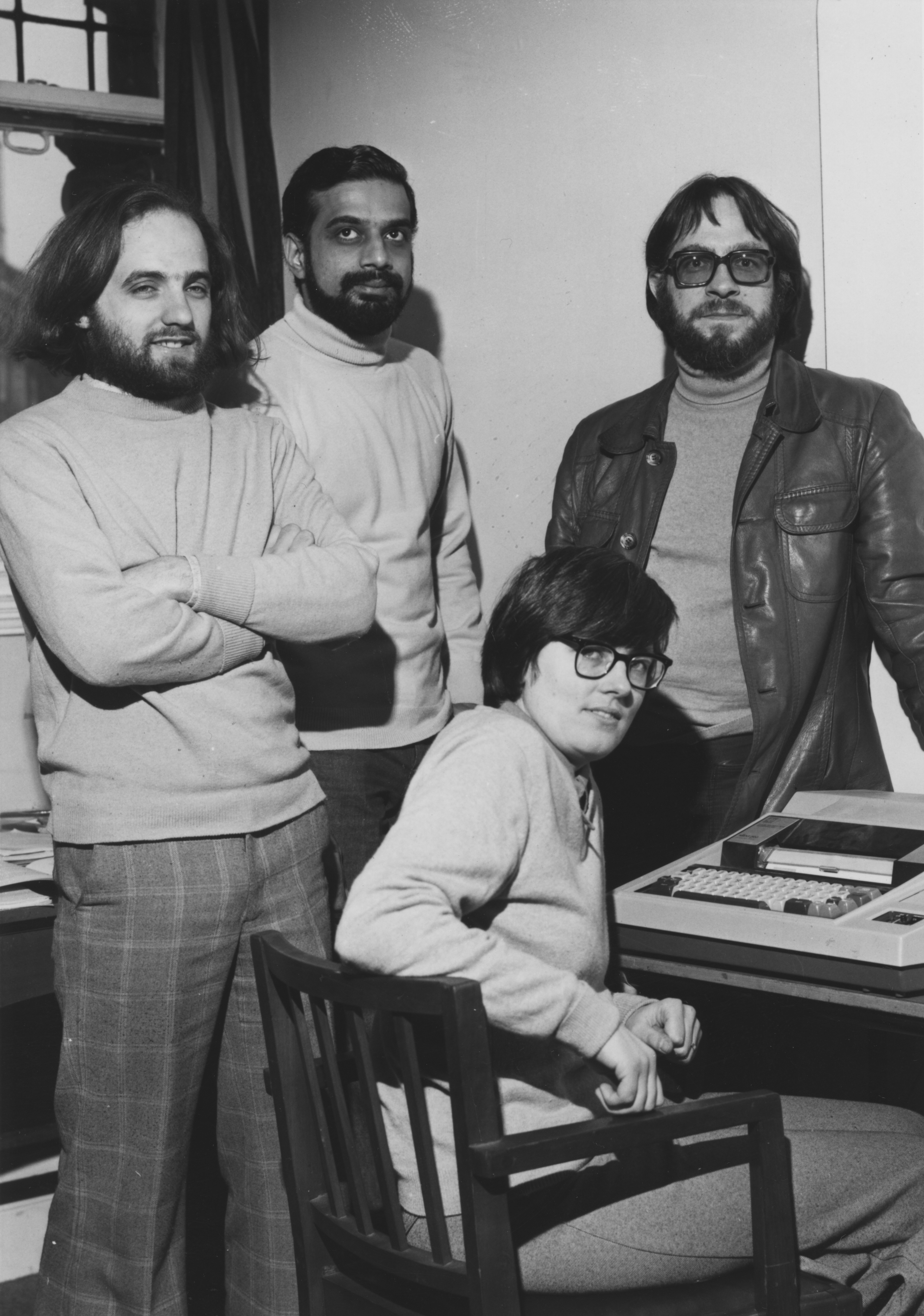
Legol Group (1977)

His work at the LSE investigating LEGOL (for LEGally Oriented Language – a computerized representation of the law) led him to incorporate the idea of Norms pioneered by Von Wright and the Affordances of Gibson in a system called NORMA (for NORMs and Affordances).

Stamper collaborated with Ronald Lee of the University of Texas on organizational deontics incorporating the Speech Acts of Austin and Searle. This led to the broader methodology he called MEASUR (for Methods for Eliciting, Analysing and Specifying Users’ Requirements). MEASUR incorporated the methods of Problem Articulation, Semantic Analysis and Norm Analysis, and uses the ontology chart.

IBM partly sponsored the research into LEGOL at the LSE, and LEGOL 2, was used as an application to test IBM's seminal Peterlee Relational Test Vehicle, the first relational database.

== Publications ==
Books

- Stamper, R. K. (1973). Information in business and administrative systems. B. T. Batsford: London and New York: Wiley.
- Stamper, R. K. (1980). LEGOL-2 for the expression of legal and organisational norms (application aspects of the LEGOL project).
- Stamper, R. K. & Lee, R. M. (1986). Doing Business with Words: Performative Aspects of Deontic Systems. Research Note 86-40, US Army Research Institute for the Behavioural and Social Sciences, Arlington, VA.
- Falkenberg, E. D. et al. (1998). A Framework of Information System Concepts. The FRISCO Report. WEB edition. [Report] IFIP 1998.
- Liu, K., Clarke, R. J., Andersen, P. B. & Stamper, R. K. (2001). Information, organisation and technology: Studies in organisational semiotics. Boston: Kluwer Academic Publishers.
- Liu, K., Clarke, R. J., Andersen, P. B. & Stamper, R. K. (2002). Coordination and communication using signs: Studies in organisational semiotics. Boston: Kluwer Academic Publishers.
- Liu, K., Clarke, R. J., Andersen, P. B. & Stamper, R. K. (2002). Organizational semiotics: Evolving a science of information systems. Boston: Kluwer Academic Publishers.
- Stamper, R. K. et al. (2004). Semiotic Methods for Enterprise Design and IT Applications. Proceedings of the 7th International Workshop on Organisational Semiotics.

Articles, a selection

- Stamper, R. K. (1971). "Some Ways of Measuring Information." Computer Bulletin, 15, 423–436.
- Stamper, R. K. (1977). "The LEGOL 1 prototype system and language." The Computer Journal, 20(2), 102.
- Stamper, R. (1977). "Physical Objects, Human Discourse and Formal Systems." Architecture and Models in Data Base Management Systems VLDB2 1977, 293–311.
- Stamper, R. K. (1977). "Informatics without computers." Informatie 19, 272–279.
- Stamper, R. K. (1978). "Aspects of data semantics: names, species and complex physical objects." Information Systems Methodology, 291-306.
- Jones, S., Mason, P. & Stamper, R. K. (1979). "LEGOL 2.0: A relational specification language for complex rules." Information Systems 4(4) 1979, pp 293–305.
- Stamper, R. K. (1980). "LEGOL: Modelling legal rules by computer." Advanced Workshop on Computer Science and Law (1979 : University College of Swansea), 45–71.
- Stamper, R. K. (1985). "Towards a Theory of Information: Information: Mystical Fluid or a Subject for Scientific Enquiry?" The Computer Journal 28, 195.
- Stamper, R. K. (1986). "Legislation, information systems and public health." International Journal of Information Management, 6(2), 103–114.
- Stamper, R. K. (1988). "Analysing the cultural impact of a system." International Journal of Information Management 8, 107–122.
- Stamper, R. K., Althaus, K. & Backhouse, J. (1988). "MEASUR: Method for Eliciting, Analysing and specifying Users Requirements." In Computerised Assistance During the information Systems life cycle, (Eds, Olle, T. W., Verrijn-Stuart, A. A. & Bhabuts, L.) Elsevier Science, Amsterdam.
- Stamper, R. K., Liu, K., Kolkman, M., Klarenberg, P., van Slooten, F., Ades, Y. & van Slooten, C. (1991). "From Database to Normbase." International Journal of Information Management (1991) 11, 67–84.
- Stamper, R. K. (1991). "The Role of Semantics in Legal Expert Systems and Legal Reasoning*." Ratio Juris, 4(2), 219–244.
- Stamper, R. K. & Kolkman, M. (1991) "Problem Articulation: A sharp-edged soft systems approach." Journal of Applied Systems Analysis 18, 69–76.
- Stamper, R. K. (1992). "Review of Andersen A Theory of Computer Semiotics." The Computer Journal 35, 368.
- Stamper, R. K. (1993). "Social Norms in Requirements Analysis – an outline of MEASUR." In Requirements Engineering Technical and Social Aspects, (Eds, Jirotka, M., Goguen, J. & Bickerton, M.) Academic Press, New York.
- Stamper, R. K., Kecheng Liu, K. & Huang, K. (1994). "Organisational morphology in re-engineering." Proceedings of Second European Conference of Information Systems, Nijenrode University, 729–737.
- Stamper, R. K. (1998). "A Dissenting Position." In: A Framework of Information System Concepts. The FRISCO Report. (Ed. Eckhard D. Falkenberg, Wolfgang Hesse, Paul Lindgreen, Björn E. Nilsson, J. L. Han Oei, Colette Rolland, Ronald K. Stamper, Frans J. M. Van Assche, Alexander A. Verrijn-Stuart, Klaus Voss). Web edition. IFIP 1998.
- Stamper, R. K. (2001). "Organisational semiotics: Informatics without the computer?" In K. Liu, R. J. Clarke, P. Bøgh Andersen, & R. K. Stamper (Eds.), Information, organisation and technology: Studies in organisational semiotics (pp. 115–171). Boston, MA: Kluwer Academic Publishers.
- Stamper, R. & Liu, K. (2002). "Organisational dynamics, social norms and information systems." System Sciences, 1994. Vol. IV: Information Systems: Collaboration Technology Organizational Systems and Technology, Proceedings of the Twenty-Seventh Hawaii International Conference on, 4, 645–654.
