= Colette Rolland =

French computer scientist (born 1943)

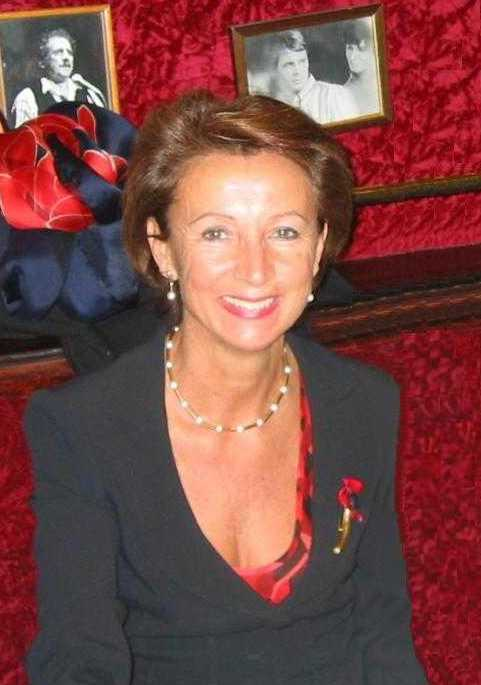
- Born: 1943 (age 82–83); Dieupentale, Tarn-et-Garonne, France
- Education: University of Henri pointcaré, Nancy
- Scientific career
- Fields: Computer scientist Conceptual modelling

Colette Rolland (born 1943, in Dieupentale, Tarn-et-Garonne, France) is a French computer scientist and Professor of Computer Science in the department of Mathematics and Informatics at the University of Paris 1 Pantheon-Sorbonne. She is a leading researcher in the area of information and knowledge systems, known for her work on meta-modeling, particularly goal modelling and situational method engineering.

== Biography ==
In 1966 she studied applied mathematics at the University of Nancy, where she received her PhD in 1971. In 1973, she was appointed Professor at the University of Nancy, Department of Computer Science. In 1979 she became professor at University of Paris 1 Pantheon-Sorbonne Department of Mathematics and Informatics. She has been involved in numerous European research projects and has led cooperative research projects with companies. She is currently Professor Emeritus of Computer Science in the department of Mathematics and Informatics.

Rolland serves on the editorial boards of several journals, including Journal of Information Systems, Journal on Information and Software Technology, Requirements Engineering Journal, Journal of Networking and Information Systems, Data and Knowledge Engineering Journal, Journal of Data Base Management and Journal of Intelligent Information Systems. She is the French representative in IFIP TC8 on Information Systems and has been the co chair and chairperson of the IFIP WG8.1 during nine years.

Rolland received numerous awards including the IFIP Silver Core, IFIP service award, the Belgium prize ‘de la Fondation Franqui’ and the European prize of ‘Information Systems’.

== Work ==
Roland's research interests are in the areas of information modeling, databases, temporal data modeling, object-oriented analysis and design, requirements engineering and specially change engineering, method engineering, CASE and CAME tools, change management and enterprise knowledge development.

== Publications ==
Rolland is the co-author of 7 textbooks; editor of 25 proceedings and author or co-author of over 280 invited and referred papers.

Books, a selection:

- 1991. Automatic Tools for Designing Office Information Systems: The Todos Approach. Research Reports ESPRIT, Project 813, Todos, Vol. 1. With B. Pernici.
- 1992. Information System Concepts: Improving the Understanding, Proceedings. With Eckhard D. Falkenberg. IFIP Transactions a, Computer Science and Technology.
- 1993. Advanced Information Systems Engineering. With F. Bodart. Springer.
- 1994. A Natural Language Approach For Requirements Engineering. With C. Proix.
- 1996. Facilitating "Fuzzy to Formal" Requirements Modelling. With Janis Bubenko, P. Loucopoulos and V. Deantonellis.
- 1988. Temporal Aspects in Information Systems. With F. Bodart. Elsevier Science Ltd.
- 1998. A framework of information system concepts. The FRISCO report. With Eckhard D. Falkenberg, Paul Lindgreen, Björn E. Nilsson, J.L. Han Oei, Ronald Stamper, Frans J M Van Assche, Alexander A. Verrijn-Stuart and Klaus Voss.
- 1998. "A proposal for a scenario classification framework". With others. In: Journal of. Requirements Engineering. vol. 3 pp. 23–47 – Springer Verlag, 1998
- 2000. Engineering information systems in the Internet context: IFIP TC8/WG8.1. With Sjaak Brinkkemper and Motoshi Saeki.
- 2005. "Modeling Goals and Reasoning with Them" with Camille Salinesi, in Engineering and Managing Software Requirements, edited by Aybüke Aurum and Claes Wohlin, Springer:Berlin/Heidelberg, p. 189‑217.
- 2005. "Measuring the fitness relationship" with Anne Etien, Requirements Engineering, vol. 10, p. 184‑197, 2005.

Papers, a selection:

- 1998. "A proposal for a scenario classification framework". With others. In: Journal of. Requirements Engineering. vol. (3) pp. 23–47 – Springer Verlag, 1998
- 2005. "Map-driven Modular Method Re-engineering: Improving the RESCUE Requirements Process". CAiSE Short Paper Proceedings 2005 with Jolita Ralyté et al.
- 2006. "Intentional Cognitive Models with Volition". With Ammar Qusaibaty, Newton Howard
- 2007. "Capturing System Intentionality with Maps", in Conceptual Modelling in Information Systems Engineering, edited by John Krogstie, Andreas Opdahl and Sjaak Brinkkemper, Springer:Berlin/Heidelberg, p. 141‑158.
- 2007. "On the Adequate Modeling of Business Process Families". With Naveen Prakash. Paper 8th Workshop on Business Process Modeling, Development, and Support.
- 2008. Requirements engineering: foundation for software quality : 14th international working conference, REFSQ 2008, Montpellier, France, June 16–17, 2008 : proceedings. With Barbara Paech (eds.).
- 2008. "Towards Engineering Purposeful Systems: A Requirements Engineering Perspective", in Database and Expert Systems Applications, edited by S. S. Bhowmick, J. Küng and R. Wagner, Lecture Notes in Computer Science, vol. 5181, Springer:Berlin/Heidelberg, p. 1‑4.
- 2009. "Exploring the Fitness Relationship between System Functionality and Business Needs", in Design Requirements Engineering: A Ten-Year Perspective, edited by Kalle Lyytinen, Pericles Loucopoulos, John Mylopoulos and Bill Robinson, Lecture Notes in Business Information processing, Springer:Berlin/Heidelberg, p. 305‑326.
- 2009. "Method engineering: towards methods as services", Software Process: Improvement and Practice, vol. 14, no 3, p. 143‑164.
- 2010. "An Intentional Approach to Service Engineering" with Manuele Kirsch-Pinheiro and Carine Souveyet, IEEE Transactions on Services Computing, vol. 3, p. 292‑305, 2010.
- 2013. Seminal Contributions to Information Systems Engineering: 25 Years of CAiSE. With Janis Bubenko, John Krogstie, Óscar Pastor, Barbara Pernici, Colette Rolland, Arne Sølvberg (eds.).
