= Eckhard D. Falkenberg =

German computer scientist

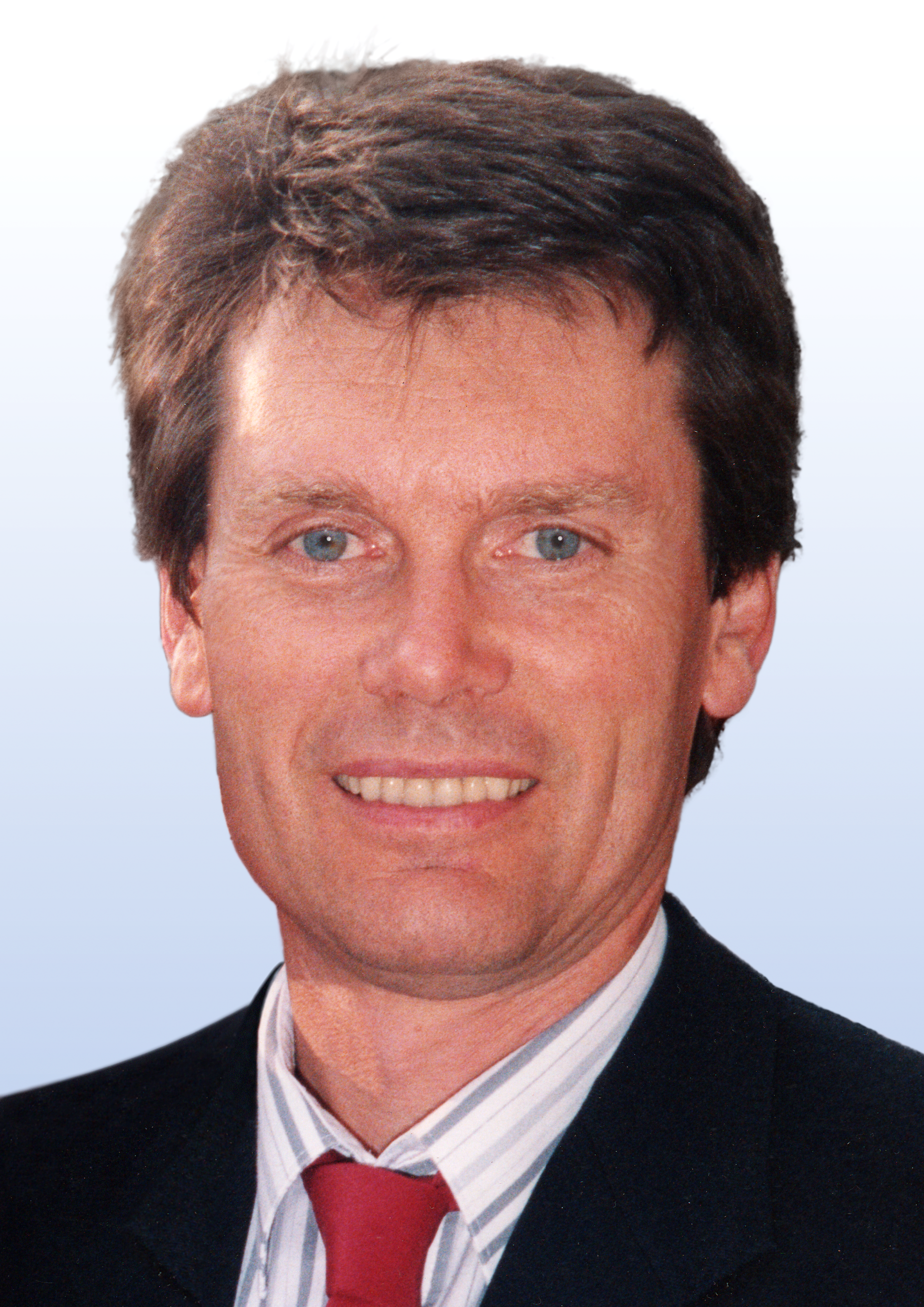
Eckhard D. Falkenberg, The Netherlands, 1989

Eckhard D. Falkenberg (born 1942) is a German scientist and Professor Emeritus of Information Systems at the Radboud University Nijmegen. He is known for his contributions in the fields of information modelling, especially object-role modeling, and the conceptual foundations of information systems.

== Biography ==
In the early 1960s Falkenberg studied electrical and telecommunications engineering at the Technical University of Munich, where he received his engineering degree under Gert Hauske and Hans Marko. Later in 1975 he obtained his PhD in informatics at the University of Stuttgart under the supervision of Hans-Jochen Schneider and Walter Knödel.

In 1967 Falkenberg had started his career as a development engineer at Telefunken in Konstanz, Germany. In 1971 he became research assistant at the computer science department of the University of Stuttgart, where he conducted his PhD research. In those days he published his first articles on modelling of database systems. In 1976 he moved to the Siemens Research Laboratories in Munich, where he became a research manager. Here he started working on manipulation and specification languages for information systems, and on the design of architecture of information systems.

In 1982 on invitation by Sjir Nijssen he moved to the University of Queensland in Australia, where he was appointed senior lecturer at its computer science department. In 1986 back in Europe Falkenberg was appointed professor of information systems at the computer science department of the Radboud University Nijmegen. Among his doctoral students were Sjaak Brinkkemper (1990), Arthur ter Hofstede (1993), Erik Proper (1994) and Patrick van Bommel (1995). Late 1990s Falkenberg retired and moved back to Germany

In 1976 Falkenberg joined the work of the International Federation for Information Processing (IFIP), where he participated in the working group on databases, TC2/WG2.6, and the working group on design and evaluation of information systems, TC8/WG8.1. In 1988 that working group started the task group Framework of Information System Concepts (FRISCO), in which Falkenberg was elected chairman. This task group is particularly known for the 1998 publication of The FRISCO Report.

== Work ==
Falkenberg's early research had focussed on modelling of database systems, and moved towards concepts for modelling information, structuring information systems and information architecture.

=== Object-Role Model ===
In his 1975 PhD thesis Falkenberg came up with the concept of the structuring and representation of information at one specific interaction: the interface between the database user and the database management system. He developed this concept into an information model, which he called the Object-Role Model.

In cooperation with Sjir Nijssen, Robert Meersman, Dirk Vermeir, Terry Halpin and other colleagues, these concepts were further developed. Eventually the Object-Role Model concept became a basic feature for methods and tools for information analysis and for developing information systems, such as Fact-oriented Modeling, Natural-language Information Analysis Method (NIAM), and Object-Role Modeling (ORM).

=== FRISCO Task Group and FRISCO Report ===
In 1988 the IFIP TC8/WG8.1 working group started a task group to develop a more comprehensive framework for information system development. The motivation, aim and scope was described in a first manifesto in IFIP (1988), which stated:

There is a growing concern within IFIP WG 8.1 about the present situation, where too many fuzzy or ill-defined concepts are used in the information systems area. Scientific as well as practice-related communication is severely distorted and hampered, due to this fuzziness and due to the frequent situation that different communication partners associate different meanings with one and the same term. There is no commonly accepted conceptual reference and terminology, to be applied for defining or explaining existing or new concepts for information systems.

The FRISCO Report (1998) eventually defined over 100 related terms, especially the term model and put them in context.

== Publications ==
Falkenberg has authored and co-authored numerous publications in the field. Books, a selection:

- Falkenberg, Eckhard D. Structuring and Representation of Information at the Interface Between Data Base User and Data Base Management System. Diss. Univ. Stuttgart (1975).
- Falkenberg, Eckhard D. & Paul Lindgreen (eds.). Information System Concepts: An In-depth Analysis. Proc. IFIP TC8/WG 8.1 Working Conference ISCO 1989. North-Holland, 1989.
- Falkenberg, Eckhard D., Wolfgang Hesse & Antoni Olivé (eds.). Information System Concepts: Towards a Consolidation of Views. Proc. IFIP TC8/WG 8.1 Working Conference ISCO 1995. Chapman & Hall, 1995.
- Falkenberg, Eckhard D., Wolfgang Hesse, Paul Lindgreen, Björn E. Nilsson, J.L. Han Oei, Colette Rolland, Ronald Stamper, Frans J.M. Van Assche, Alexander A. Verrijn-Stuart & Klaus Voss. A Framework of Information System Concepts. The FRISCO Report. International Federation for Information Processing (IFIP), 1998.
- Falkenberg, Eckhard D., Kalle Lyytinen & Alexander A. Verrijn-Stuart (eds.). Information System Concepts: An Integrated Discipline Emerging. Proc. IFIP TC8/WG 8.1 Working Conference ISCO 1999. Kluwer Academic Publishers, 2000.

Articles, a selection:

- Falkenberg, Eckhard D. "Concepts for Modelling Information." in: Proc. IFIP TC2/WG2.6 Working Conference on Modelling in Data Base Management Systems. North-Holland, 1976. p. 95-109.
- Falkenberg, Eckhard D., J.L. Han Oei & Henderik Alex Proper. "Evolving Information Systems: Beyond Temporal Information Systems." in: Database and Expert Systems Applications. Springer Vienna, 1992. p. 282-287.
