= Tony Morgan =

Tony Morgan may refer to:

- Tony Morgan (sailor) (1931–2024), British Olympic sailor
- Tony Morgan (weightlifter) (born 1969), British weightlifter
- Tony Morgan (computer scientist) (born c. 1944), British computer scientist

== See also ==
- Anthony Morgan (disambiguation)
