= Anthony Morgan =

Anthony Morgan may refer to:

- Sir Anthony Morgan of Kilfigin (died 1665), Royalist officer during the English Civil War
- Sir Anthony Morgan (politician) (1621–1668), fought on both sides in the English Civil War, represented parliament during the Interregnum after the Restoration an original F.R.S.
- Anthony Morgan of Marshfield and Casebuchan (1627–?), Royalist officer during the English Civil War
- Anthony Morgan of Freshwater (died 1729), English army officer, Lieutenant-Governor of the Isle of Wight, and Member of Parliament
- Anthony Morgan (American football) (born 1967), retired American football player
- Anthony Morgan (comedian), Australian comedian

== See also ==
- Tony Morgan (disambiguation)
