= Bled eConference =

Bled eConference is an annual international conference on “e” (e-commerce, e-business, e-health, e-government, EDI, IOS, social networks, m-commerce etc.) attracting speakers and delegates from business and academia, government officials and IT providers from around the world. The conference is organized by eCenter of University of Maribor Faculty of Organizational Sciences, Slovenia in cooperation with an international program committee, currently counting ~55 members from ~22 countries worldwide. The program consists of Research Track, including peer-reviewed research paper presentations, and Business Track, presenting panels, workshops and meetings. Since 2007 the program also includes René W. Wagenaar Prototype Bazaar dedicated to PhD and MsC students’ presentations of e-prototypes and business e-solutions.

It takes place in Bled, Slovenia.

Bled eConference is considered to be the world's longest-running conference on “e”, established in 1988 by Jože Gričar, PhD.

== Research Track ==
Bled eConference has featured research papers since its inception. A fully reviewed Research Track was established in 1995, running parallel tracks of 40-50 papers each year, with an acceptance rate around 50%. Since 1999, the Research Track has included an Outstanding Paper Award.

In 2006 Bled eConference has entered a strategic partnership with the journal, Electronic Markets.

The Research Volume of Bled eConference Proceedings is included in international AIS – Association of Information Systems Electronic Library (since 2001) and since 2008 in Conference Proceedings Citation Index - an integrated index within Web of Science.

Web 2.0 and social media will play a ver important part of the 2011 Bled eConference

== History ==
Established in March 1988, conference started out as a consultation meeting on Electronic Data Interchange (EDI) for the representatives of Slovenian organizations. The meeting was initiated by Jože Gričar and organized by the Chamber of Commerce and Industry of Slovenia in Ljubljana. The Second consultation meeting on EDI was held in Bled, which later becomes a traditional venue of the event, and it was open to the broader public. 120 representatives from companies, banks and government attended the meeting to hear 19 submissions and see a live demonstration of a prototype solution for the electronic order exchange. The conference had opened for international participants in its third year, adding participants from USA, Austria, Japan and Poland to the program. In 1991 the consultation meeting grows into The International Electronic Data Interchange Conference with 260 participants from 15 countries and 56 research papers.

Conference edited its name again in 1993, adding Interorganizational Systems (IOS) to it. As the development trends indicated in 1997 the terms EDI and IOS in the conference's name were substituted with the term Electronic Commerce, also the conference recognized Bled as its traditional venue (10th Bled Electronic Commerce Conference). The last change to the conference's name was made in 2005, when the conference was renamed Bled eConference due to the broader research field presented at the conference each year.

== List of Bled eConferences ==
| Year | Conference Title | Theme | Dates |
|---|---|---|---|
| 1988 | RIP – Računalniško izmenjavanje podatkov (1. posvetovanje) (in Slovene) | | March |
| 1989 | RIP – Računalniško izmenjavanje podatkov (2. posvetovanje) (in Slovene) | | June 20–21 |
| 1990 | 3rd EDI Conference / 3. Posvetovanje o računalniškem izmenjavanju podatkov (RIP) (in Slovene and English) | | June 4–5 |
| 1991 | The 4th EDI Electronic Data Interchange Conference | EDI: Business Strategy for 90s | June 10–12 |
| 1992 | The 5th International Electronic Data Interchange Conference | Interorganizational Systems in the Global Environment | September 3–5 |
| 1993 | 6th International Conference EDI (Electronic Data Interchange) & IOS (Interorganizational Systems) | Strategic Systems in the Global Economy of the 90s | June 7–9 |
| 1994 | 7th International EDI – IOS Conference | Electronic Commerce Electronic Partnership | June 6–8 |
| 1995 | 8th International Conference on EDI and Inter-Organizational Systems | Electronic Commerce for Trade Efficiency | June 5–7 |
| 1996 | 9th International Conference on EDI-IOS | Electronic Commerce for Trade Efficiency and Effectiveness | June 10–12 |
| 1997 | 10th Bled Electronic Commerce Conference | Global business in practice | June 22–23 |
| 1998 | 11th Bled Electronic Commerce Conference | Electronic commerce in the information society | June 8–10 |
| 1999 | 12th Bled Electronic Commerce Conference | Global networked organizations | June 7–9 |
| 2000 | 13th Bled Electronic Commerce Conference | Electronic Commerce "The end of the beginning" | June 19–21 |
| 2001 | 14th Bled Electronic Commerce Conference | e-Everything: e-Commerce, e-Government, e-Household, e-Democracy | June 25–26 |
| 2002 | 15th Bled Electronic Commerce Conference | eReality: Constructing the eEconomy | June 17–19 |
| 2003 | 16th Bled eCommerce Conference | eTransformation | June 9–11 |
| 2004 | 17th Bled eCommerce Conference | eGlobal | June 21–23 |
| 2005 | 18th Bled eConference | eIntegration in Action | June 6–8 |
| 2006 | 19th Bled eConference | eValues | June 5–7 |
| 2007 | 20th Bled eConference | eMergence: Merging and Emerging Technologies, Processes, and Institutions | June 3–6 |
| 2008 | 21st Bled eConference | eCollaboration: Overcoming Boundaries Through Multi-Channel Interaction | June 15–18 |
| 2009 | 22nd Bled eConference | eEnablement:Facilitating an Open, Effective and Representative eSociety | June 14–17 |
| 2010 | 23rd Bled eConference | eTrust: Implications for the Individual, Enterprises and Society | June 20–23 |
| 2011 | 24th Bled eConference | eFuture Creating Solutions for the Individual, Organisations and Society | June 12–15 |
| 2012 | 25th Bled eConference | eDependability: Reliable and Trustworthy eStructures, eProcesses, eOperations and eServices for the Future | June 17–20 |
| 2013 | 26th Bled eConference | eInnovation: Challenges and Impacts for Individuals, Organizations and Society | June 9–13 |

== See also ==
- E-commerce
- E-business
- EDI - Electronic Data Interchange
- Information Systems
- Management Information Systems
- 24th Bled E Conference Future Internet Man Sze Li 1 del
- 24th Bled E Conference Use of Social Media on the Cocreation Services The Case of UK Julia Glidden 1del
