= Roel in 't Veld =

Dutch academic and politician

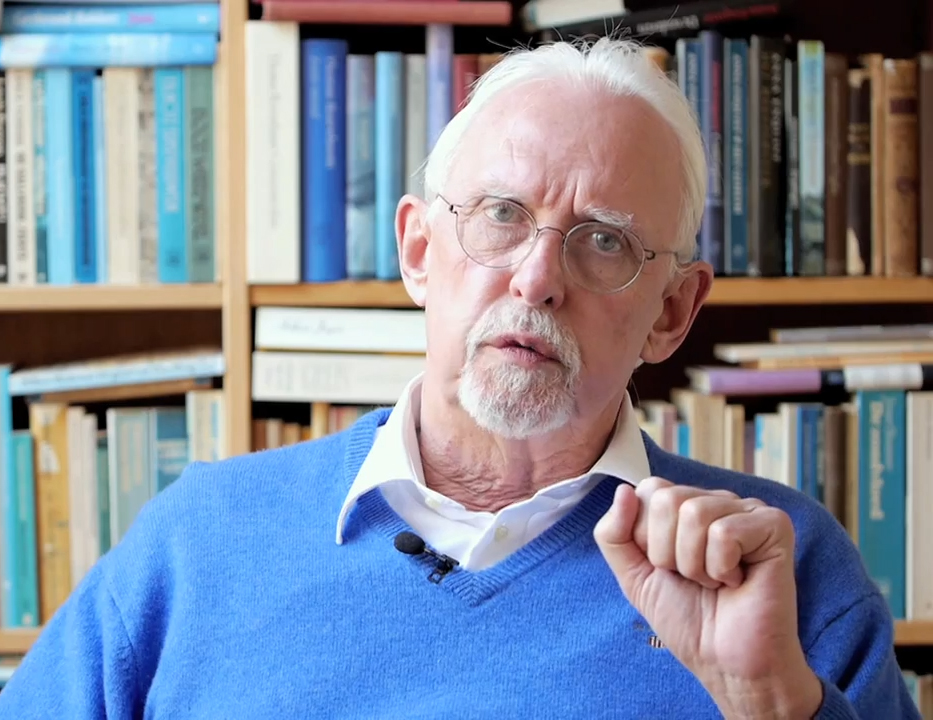
Roel in 't Veld, 2014

Roeland Jaap (Roel) in 't Veld (born 20 July 1942) is a Dutch scholar of public administration and Labour Party politician. He was briefly State Secretary for the Ministry of Education, Culture and Science in 1993.

== Biography ==
Born and raised in The Hague, In 't Veld attended the gymnasium from 1953 to 1959. In 1959 he obtained his Propaedeutics in economics at the Netherlands School of Economics in Rotterdam (nowadays Erasmus University Rotterdam). He continued to study law at the University of Leiden, where he obtained his MA in 1964. Later in 1975 he obtained a PhD in law, his thesis being titled Majority System Theory and Prosperity.

In 1964 he began his career as lecturer in economics at the University of Leiden. In 1969 he became policy officer for planning and budgeting at the main service Planning Information and Allocation (PISA) of the University of Leiden. In 1976-77 he was a researcher at the Netherlands Institute for Advanced Study in the Humanities and Social Sciences (NIAS). In 1977 he was appointed Professor of Public Administration at the University of Nijmegen.

From 1982 to 1988 he was Director General at the Dutch Ministry of Education and Science. In 1989 he founded together with Uri Rosenthal, the Dutch School of Public Administration (NSOB), and until 2004 was its dean. From 2007 to 2010 he was a lecturer in Democracy at the Inholland University of Applied Sciences.

In 't Veld returned to the academic world from 1988 to 1993, as Professor of Public Administration at the Erasmus University Rotterdam. In 1993 he was appointed Secretary of State for Education and Science as a successor to Jacques Wallage. Labour leader Wim Kok called his arrival a quality boost. In't Veld, however, stepped back after ten days because of problems surrounding secondary functions that he fulfilled.

From 1994 to 2005 he was extraordinary professor of organizational behavior at the University of Amsterdam, and hereby to 2002 Rector of Sioo, inter-university center for organizing and changing. Besides. From 1995 to 2004 he was also professor of management in public administration at the University of Utrecht, and since 2002 extraordinary professor hybrid organizations, Open University of the Netherlands, Heerlen. Since 2005 he is also Professor of Governance at the University of Netherlands Antilles, and from 2007 to 2010 lecturer democracy to Inholland. Since November 2010 he has been professor at the University of Tilburg, holding a chair in "Governance and Sustainability".

In 't Veld has performed many other positions. He has been honored as a Knight of the Order of the Dutch Lion .

== Selected publications ==
- Veld, Roel in 't, and D.J. Kraan (eds.). Environmental protection: public or private choice. Kluwer 1991.
- Roeland J. in 't Veld, Hans-Peter Füssel, Guy R. Neave. Relations between state and higher education. 1996.
- De Bruijn, Hans, ten Heuvelhof, Ernst, in 't Veld. Process management why project management fails in complex decision making processes. Boston, MA: Kluwer, 2002.
- Veld, Roel in 't, Knowledge democracy consequences for science, politics, and media. Springer Verlag 2010.

Political offices
Preceded by Jacques Wallage	State Secretary for Education and Sciences; 1993	Succeeded by Job Cohen
