= Janis Bubenko =

Swedish computer scientist (1935–2022)

Janis Askolds Bubenko junior (Latvian: Jānis Askolds Bubenko jaunākais; 3 February 1935 – 15 January 2022) was a Swedish computer scientist and professor emeritus at the Department of Computer and Systems Science, Royal Institute of Technology and Stockholm University.

== Biography ==
Born 1935 in Riga, Latvia, Bubenko fled with his family to Sweden at the end of World War II in 1944. He received his MSc in civil engineering from the Chalmers University of Technology in Gothenburg, Sweden, in 1958, his Licentiate of Technology in structural mechanics also from the Chalmers University of Technology in 1958. In 1973 he received his Ph.D. in information systems from the Royal Institute of Technology in Stockholm in 1973, and his habilitation in 1974.

In 1961 Bubenko started his career as a manager in Univac Scandinavia, a branch of the U.S. computer company Univac. In 1965 he started as an assistant professor at the Royal Institute of Technology, where in 1969 he founded the research group Computer Aided Design of Information Systems (CADIS). From 1977 to 1981 he was a professor of computer and systems sciences at University of Gothenburg and Chalmers University of Technology, and from 1981 to 2000 professor at the Royal Institute of Technology and University of Stockholm.

Bubenko has chaired multiple information systems conferences since the late 1970s. He is member of Association for Computing Machinery (ACM), the Institute of Electrical and Electronics Engineers (IEEE) Computer Society, and the International Federation for Information Processing (IFIP) Working Group 8.1.

Bubenko died on 15 January 2022 in Lund, Sweden, at the age of 86.

== Publications ==
Bubenko authored and co-authored more than 140 articles, and seven textbooks in the fields of "Information Systems Development Methods, Performance Analysis of Data Processing Systems, Operating Systems, and Conceptual Modelling Methods". Books, a selection:

- 1971. Computer-aided information systems analysis and design. The first Scandinavian workshop. With Arne Sølvberg and Börje Langefors (Eds).
- 1973. Contributions to formal description, analysis and design of data processing systems. Stockholm. Libris
- 2000. Information systems engineering: state of the art and research themes. With Sjaak Brinkkemper, Eva Lindencrona and Arne Sølvberg.
- 2003. Working Conference on the History of Nordic Computing (1st : 2003 : Trondheim, Norway) History of Nordic computing : IFIP WG9.7 First Working Conference on the History of Nordic Computing (HiNC1), June 16–18, 2003, Trondheim, Norway. Edited with Arne Sølvberg and John Impagliazzo.

Articles, a selection:

- 2007. "From Information Algebra to Enterprise Modelling and Ontologies - a Historical Perspective on Modelling for Information Systems". In: Conceptual Modelling in Information Systems Engineering. John Krogstie et al. eds. pp 1–18
