= Frans van Vught =

Dutch social scientist

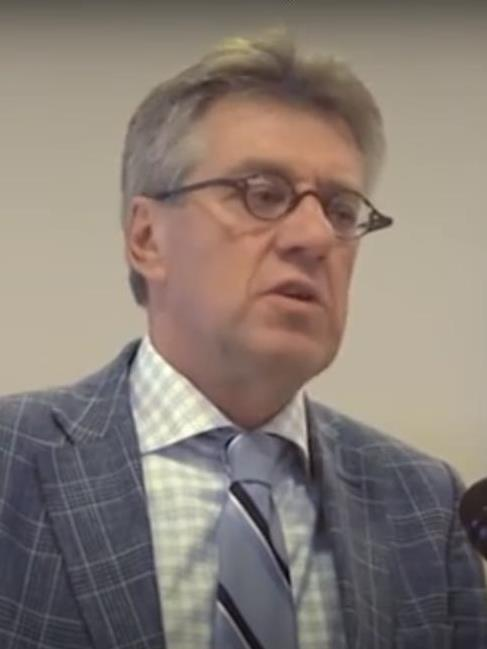
Frans van Vught (2011)

Franciscus Adrianus (Frans) van Vught (born July 23, 1950) is a Dutch social scientist and Professor of Higher Education Policy at the University of Twente, known for his work on the theory of higher education innovation, higher education policy and relationship between government and higher education.

== Biography ==
Born in Montfoort, Van Vught obtained his MA in urban planning, regional planning and sociology at the University of Utrecht in 1975. Subsequently he held a postdoc position in urban studies at the Massachusetts Institute of Technology. In 1982 he obtained his PhD in Public Administration from the University of Twente with the thesis entitled "Experimentele beleidsplanning : bestuurskundige expedities in de jungle van het planningsdenken" (Experimental planning: public administration expeditions in the jungle of the planning thought).

After his graduation in 1982 Van Vught started his academic career as Associate Professor in the Department of Public Administration of the University of Twente, where in 1986 he was promoted to Professor of Planning Methodology. From 1997 to 2005 he was rector and president of the University of Twente, and since 2005 he is Honorary professor of Higher Education Policy. In 2005 he joined the board of the European University Association, and from 2005 to 2014 Van Vught was also President of the European Center for Strategic Management of Universities.

In 1995 he co-founded the Dutch Institute of Government (NIG), a research school of Departments of Public Administration and Departments of Political Science of the Dutch Universities, and became its first director. In 2002 he was elected member of the Social-Economic Council. Since 2006 he is director of the Netherland House for education and research (Nether), national research school.

In 1999 Van Vught was awarded an honorary doctorate from the University of Ghent for his great merit for science policy and administration, and in 2007 he received an honorary doctorate from the University of Strathclyde in Glasgow for his influential publications and higher education research.

== Work ==
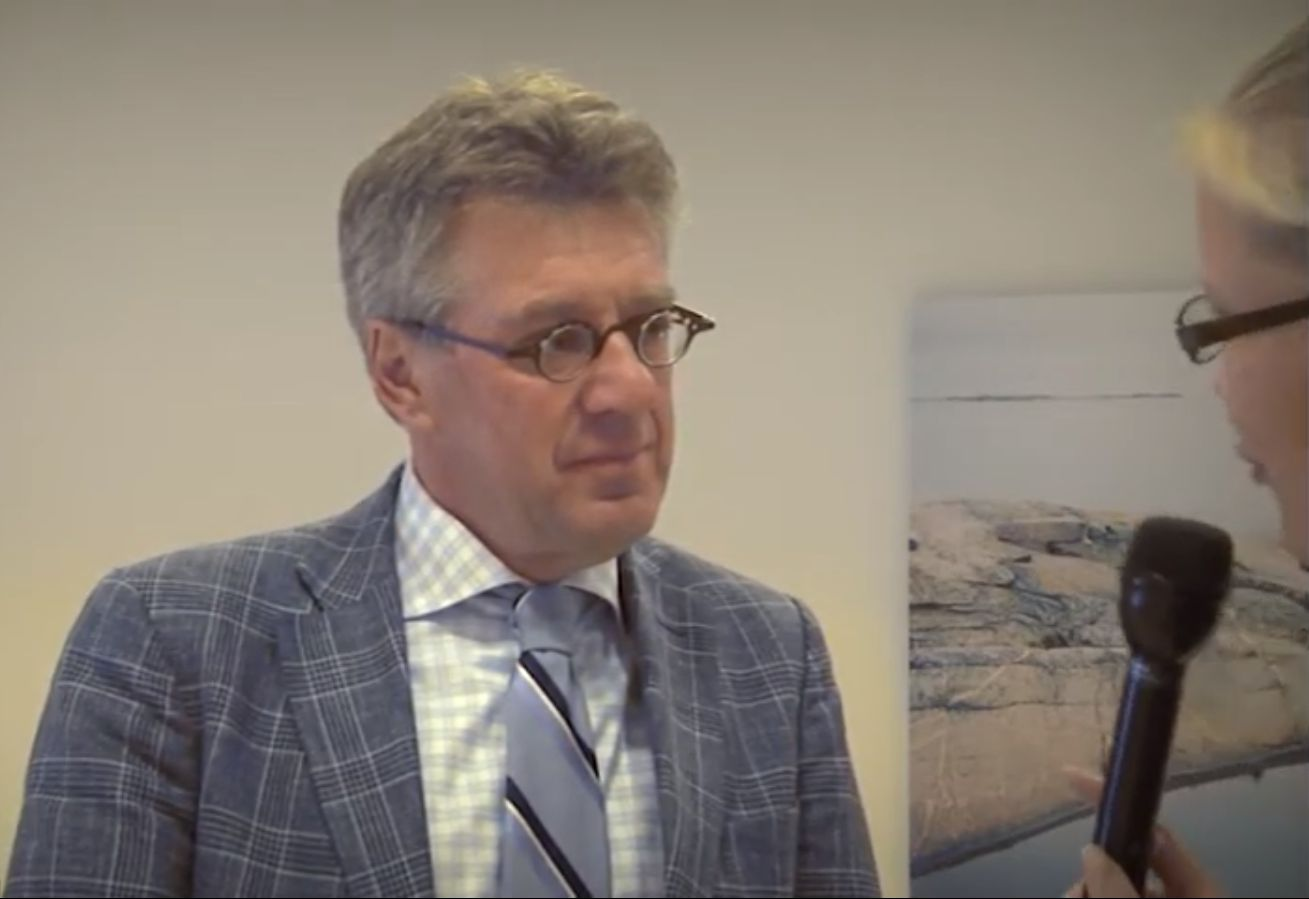
UASnet Helsinki Conference 2011 interview with Frans van Vught, 2011

In the late 1970s Van Vught came into prominence with some reference works on planning and policy, which has had a significant influence on the development of public administration and policy science. Later on he gained attention as expert in the field of higher education.[3] He has written more than 30 books and over 250 articles in the fields of planning, policy and higher education.

=== Forecasting ===
In the late 1970s and early 1980s Van Vught wrote a series of books on methods and techniques for future research including "Forecasting" in 1978, "Experimentele Beleidsplanning" (Experimental Policy Planning) in 1982 and "Impact Forecasting" in 1989. Here he developed a fundamentally-epistemological analysis of the possibilities and limitations of foresight, which has had great influence on the future-oriented thinking in policy and management processes.

=== Social Planning ===
In the book 1979 "Sociale planning: oorsprong en ontwikkeling van het Amerikaanse planningsdenken" (Social Planning: origin and development of the American Planning thinking) Frans van Vught provides an overview of the many theoretical orientations in the planning world . Social planning he defines as the planned intervention in the social processes, both in terms of social, economic and spatial properties. A real planning theory in this regard does not exist, and the then literature was a proliferation of considerations. The book "Social planning" is an attempt to identify approaches herein and the bases thereof to verify.

== Selected publications ==
- Maassen, Peter AM, and Frans A. van Vught. Strategic planning. Centrum voor Studies van het Hoger Onderwijsbeleid van de Universiteit Twente, 1990.
- Van Vught, Frans A. Governmental Strategies and Innovation in Higher Education. Higher Education Policies Series, 7. Taylor and Francis Group, 1989.
- Neave, Guy R., and Frans Van Vught. Prometheus bound: The changing relationship between government and higher education in Western Europe. Pergamon, 1991.
- Neave, Guy, and Frans A. Van Vught. Government and Higher Education Relationships across Three Continents: The Winds of Change. Issues in Higher Education Series, Volume 2. Pergamon Press, Elsevier Science Ltd., 1994.
- Kickert, Walter Julius Michael, and Frans van Vught, eds. Public policy and administration sciences in the Netherlands. Prentice Hall, 1995.
- Kaiser, F., Maassen, P., Meek, L., van Vught, F., de Weert, E., & Goedegebuure, L. (Eds.). (2014). Higher education policy: An international comparative perspective. Elsevier.
