= Börje Langefors Best Doctoral Dissertation Award =

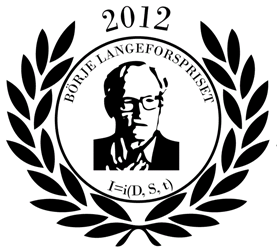

The Börje Langefors Award (Swedish Börje Langeforspriset) is an annual academic prize awarded since 2011 by the Swedish Information Systems Academy (Svenska informationssystemakademin (SISA)) for the best doctoral dissertation in Sweden in the subject areas - informatics, information systems, data and information science or equivalent. The prize aims to reward and encourage development of high standard research in Sweden, and to demonstrate exemplary research in informatics.

== Origin ==
The award was named after Professor Börje Langefors (1915–2009), one of those who made systems development a science. Langefors was a Swedish engineer and computer scientist, and emeritus professor of business information systems at the Department of Computer and Systems Science, Stockholm University and Royal Institute of Technology, Stockholm. Langefors was a pioneer of IT and one of the initiators of "informatics" as an academic area of study. He was the first IT professor in Sweden and one of the first in the world. Langefors contributed strongly to put Sweden on the international IT map and brought into a focus in particular to the user's role in data processing. Langefors brought more than 20 graduate students to degree most of which today are professors who in turn have brought their students to graduates.

== Award criteria ==
The following quality criteria are applied for the evaluation of individual doctoral thesis:

- Relevance: Articulate, well-defined and well-motivated research question(s)
- Articulate and well-reflected research design
- Comprehensiveness: Chosen and used well described theory base
- Well described empirical base
- Validity of knowledge (empirically and theoretically well-grounded)
- Contribution validity and durability (abstraction) to further research
- Innovative value in knowledge contributions
- Independence (of author's own contribution)
- Communicability: Clarity, transparency and conceptual clarity
- Internal coherence: holistic and coherent argument
- Subject (IS field) congruency
- Ability to serve as a "Role model"
- International exposure /review

The awards during 2011-2016 were sponsored by Nethouse and Sitevision.

== Prize committee ==
Every year in spring (usually in May), a prize committee assesses the theses submitted by the universities/institutions in Sweden and nominates the best dissertation, which is finally announced in connection with SISA's annual conference. The members in 2016 were:

- Professor Karin Hedström, Örebro University
- Professor Tero Päivärinta, Luleå University of Technology
- Professor Jan Ljungberg, University of Gothenburg
- Professor Jeremy Rose, University of Skövde
- Professor Vivian Vimarlund, Linköping University

== Winners ==
=== 2023 ===
Cristina Ghita for Technology in Absentia: A New Materialist Study of Digital Disengagement.

=== 2022 ===
Andreas Hedrén

=== 2021 ===
Hannes Göbel for Designing Digital Resourcing

=== 2020 ===
Daniel Skog, Umeå University for The Dynamics of Digital Transformation.

Leif Sundberg, Mid University Sweden

=== 2019 ===
Susanne Lindberg, Halmstad University

Fatemeh Saadatmand, Borås University

=== 2018 ===
Olgerta Tona from Lund University

=== 2017 ===
Malin Granath

=== 2016 ===
Daniel Nylén

=== 2015 ===
Johan Sandberg, Postdoctoral Researcher at the Umeå University awarded the first best for his doctoral dissertation titled Digital Capability: Investigating Coevolution of IT and Business Strategies

=== 2014 ===
Mathias Hatakka, Senior Lecturer at the Örebro University awarded the first best for his doctoral dissertation titled The capability approach in ict4d research.

=== 2013 ===
Anders Olof Larsson at the Department of Informatics and Media of Uppsala University for his thesis Doing Things in Relation to Machines - Studies on Online Interactivity.

The committee stated: "The thesis is based on a socially relevant contemporary topic, well-designed and well-defined subject area with contrasting perspectives based on exceptional and interesting empirical material. The thesis is easy to read and well structured with well linked articles. It has a very good international exposure".

=== 2012 ===
Henrik Wimelius, assistant professor at the Umeå University awarded the first best for his doctoral dissertation titled Duplicate Systems: Investigating Unintended Consequences of Information Technology in Organizations.

The committee stated: "Henrik Wimelius dissertation is well written and clearly positioned against existing literature. The question that is addressed both theoretically and practically interesting. Methodologically the research is based on a rigorous process, presented in a reflexive manner. Furthermore, logic and structure of the thesis is well thought. The existence of parallel, competing IT systems in organizations and activities tend to help Henrik with valuable insights and lessons learned. His thesis is an excellent knowledge base which can advantageously be further exploited."

M Sirajul Islam, Associate Professor at the Örebro University awarded for 'Outstanding doctoral dissertation' titled Creating Opportunity by Connecting the Unconnected: Deploying Mobile Phone-based Agriculture Market Information Service for Farmers in Bangladesh.

The committee stated: " Sirajul Islam's dissertation "reports a design-oriented action research project that sought to create sustainable societal effects by facilitating mobile technology adoption. One interesting aspect of this change effort is that it nicely illustrates how informatics research can help underprivileged groups to strengthen their positions through innovative IT use. The research project was executed through a well-designed process that is presented in a comprehensive yet detailed way. In particular, it reveals how and why certain practical and theoretical issues were tackled to push the project forward. Constituting the core of the thesis, the set of articles suggests that the results produced were not only locally relevant but also globally impactful." A brief interview about his thesis is available in this link.

=== 2011 ===
Annika Andersson at the Informatics Department of Örebro University for her thesis Learning to learn in e-Learning: constructive practices for development.

The committee stated: "Annika Andersson is awarded the prize for best dissertation for the following reasons: socially relevant subject matter, well formulated and relevant theoretical basis, proper research design with appropriate method triangulation and sequencing of sub-studies, comprehensive and interesting empirical work, good incremental cumulative knowledge, clear and well-structured presentation, good design of compilation thesis with a well-developed cover paper, a good international exposure."
