= Alex Verrijn Stuart =

Dutch computer scientist (1923–2004)

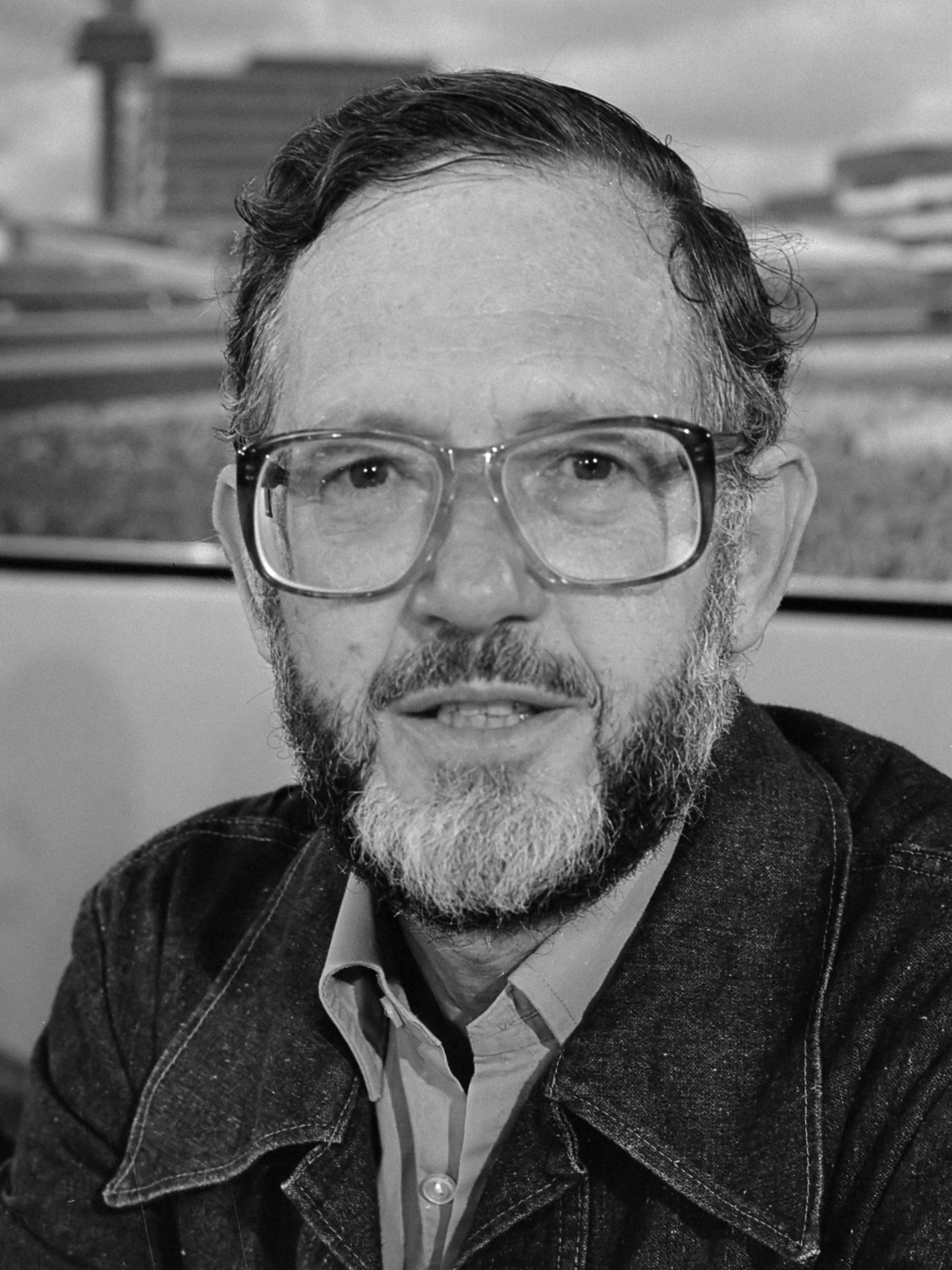
Xander Verrijn Stuart (1982)

Adolf Alexander (Alex or Xander) Verrijn Stuart (Rotterdam, 22 October 1923 – Haarlem, 29 October 2004) was a Dutch computer scientist, and the first Professor in computer science at the Leiden University from 1969 tot 1991.

== Biography ==
Alex Verrijn Stuart was born in Rotterdam, where his father was professor in economics at the Erasmus University Rotterdam. His grandfather was the economist Coenraad Alexander Verrijn Stuart, who in 1899 was the first president of the Statistics Netherlands.

Verrijn Stuart received an MA in physics at the Delft University of Technology, and he received a Ph.D. from the University of Michigan. Afterwards he worked at the operations research department of Royal Dutch Shell for 18 years. In 1969 he was appointed the first Professor in computer science in the Netherlands, at the Leiden University. From 1973 to 1974 he had been a fellow at the Netherlands Institute for Advanced Study. In 1976 he was one of the founding members of the IFIP TC8 Technical Committee of Information Systems. Among his graduate student were Dewald Roode and Sjaak Brinkkemper.

Alex Verrijn Stuart was also an ice skater and mountaineer. In 1940 he skated his first Elfstedentocht of the five to come. In 1977 he was the leader of an expedition to climb the Annapurna I. In 1982 he was part of an expedition to the Mount Everest that failed.

== Publications ==
Books, a selection:

- 1982. Information Systems Design Methodologies: A Comparative Review Proceedings of the IFIP WG 8.1 Working Conference on Cooperative Review of Information Systems Design Methodologies, Noordwijkerhout, The Netherlands, 10–14 May 1982. Ed. with T. William Olle and Henk G. Sol. North-Holland. ISBN 0-444-86407-5
- 1986. Trends in Information Systems: An Anthology of Papers from Conferences of the IFIP Technical Committee 8 "Information Systems" to Commemorate their Tenth Anniversary. With Börje Langefors and Giampio Bracchi. International Federation for Information Processing. Technical Committee for Information Systems.
- 1994. Methods and Associated Tools for the Information Systems Life Cycle, Proceedings of the IFIP WG8.1 Working Conference on Methods and Associated Tools for the Information Systems Life Cycle, Maastricht, The Netherlands, 26–28 September 1994. Ed. with T. William Olle. Elsevier IFIP Transactions.
- 1998. A Framework of Information System Concepts. The FRISCO Report. With Eckhard D. Falkenberg, Wolfgang Hesse, Paul Lindgreen, Björn E. Nilsson, J.L. Han Oei, Colette Rolland, Ronald Stamper, Frans J.M. Van Assche, and Klaus Voss.
- 2000. Information System Concepts: An Integrated Discipline Emerging. Proc. IFIP TC8/WG 8.1 Working Conference ISCO 1999. Ed. with Eckhard D. Falkenberg and Kalle Lyytinen. Kluwer Academic Publishers, 2000
- 2002. The Future of Science and the Humanities. Ed. with Tindemans, P. and Visser, R. Amsterdam University Press, Amsterdam
