= Henk G. Sol =

Dutch business theorist

Henk Gerard Sol (born 11 August 1951 in Borger, Netherlands) is a Dutch organizational theorist and Emeritus Professor of Business Engineering and ICT at Groningen University. His research focuses on the development of services enabled by ICT, management information systems, decision enhancement and telematics.

== Biography ==
Sol was born in 1951 near Groningen. In 1974 he received an M.A. in Econometrics, Operations Research and Information Systems from the University of Groningen. In 1982 here he also received a PhD on the subject of "Simulation in Information Systems Development".

From 1974 to 1984 Sol was assistant professor at the University of Groningen, where he was involved in the development and control of a Masters Program in Information Systems within the School of Economics and Management Science. In 1984 he became professor of Information Systems Development at Delft University of Technology (TU Delft), where he developed the Department of Information Systems to one of the leading Information Engineering Schools in Europe. In 1992 he became Professor of Systems Engineering at Delft University of Technology. Since 2004 he is Professor of Business Engineering and ICT at Groningen University.

From 1992 to 1998 Sol was founding Dean of the new School for Engineering, Policy Analysis and Management at the TU Delft. He prepared the merger, in 1998, into the Faculty of Technology, Policy and Management (TPM). From 1999 to 2004 he was appointed as Scientific Director of Delft Institute for Information technology in Systems Engineering (DITSE). From 2000 tot 2003 he was again Dean of the Faculty of Technology, Policy & Management. From 2004 to 2008 he was founding Dean of the Faculty of Economic and Business at the University of Groningen. He is also an external review at the MIT Portugal Program that was launched in October 2006.

He serves or acts in editorial roles with journals as "Decision Support Systems", "Electronic Journal of E-commerce", "Organizational Science", "Communications of AIS" and "Information and Management". He is member of IFIP TC 8, W.G. 8.1, 8.2, 8.4 and one of the founding fathers of AIS as one of its first vice-presidents.

Sol has acted as a management consultant for several governments and large range of national and international organizations since 1972. He is chairman/member of the (Supervisory) Board of Directors of several companies, currently at Joh. Enschedé BV, and Groningen Airport Eelde NV.

He received the IFIP Outstanding Service Award as well as the IFIP Silver Core. In 2003 the TU Delft TPM Faculty initiated an annual Henk G. Sol Award for faculty members and PhD students for the best paper or publication, in honor of Prof. Henk Sol, who may be regarded as the "founding father" of TPM. The main lecture hall at TPM is named after Henk G. Sol.

He appeared as a keynote speaker at various international scientific conferences: BIS, DSS 2.0 and others.

== Publications ==
He is a well-known author with a few hundred publications in the fields of ICT, management information systems, decision support systems and telematics. A selection:

- 1982. Simulation in information systems development. Dissertation University of Groningen
- 1982. Information systems design methodologies : a comparative review : proceedings of the IFIP WG 8.1 Working Conference on Cooperative Review of Information Systems Design Methodologies, Noordwijkerhout, The Netherlands, 10–14 May 1982. Ed. with T. William Olle and A.A. Verrijn Stuart. North-Holland. ISBN 0-444-86407-5
- 1987. Expert systems and artificial intelligence in decision support systems : proceedings of the second Mini Euroconference, Lunteren, The Netherlands, 17–20 November 1985. Ed. with Cees A.Th. Takkenberg and Pieter F. de Vries Robbé. Reidel. ISBN 90-277-2437-7
- 1991. Dynamic modelling of information systems I. Edited with Kees van Hee. North-Holland ISBN 0-444-88923-X
- 2008. Decision enhancement services : rehearsing the future for decisions that matter. With Peter G.W. Keen. IOS Press. ISBN 978-1-58603-837-3
