= Guy Neave =

British social scientist

Guy Richard Neave (born 1941) is a British social scientist and Emeritus Professor of Comparative Higher Education Policy Studies at the University of Twente, known for his work on higher education in Europe.

== Biography ==
Neave obtained his PhD in French political history at the University College London (UCL) in 1967.

After his graduation, Neave started his academic career teaching modern European history. In the mid-1970s he started to focus his work on the contemporary sociology of education. He was appointed Professor of Comparative education at the University of London. From 1976 to 1985 he participated in the European Cultural Foundation as director of its Institute of Education and Social Policy. In the late 1990s he moved to the University of Twente, where he was appointed Professor of Comparative Higher Education Policy Studies at its Centrum voor Hoger Onderwijs Beleid en Studies. He was also Director of Research for the International Association of Universities in Paris. Later in the new millennium he was appointed Director of Research at the Centre for Higher Education on Policies Studies (CIPES) in Matosinhos, Portugal.

== Selected publications ==
- Neave, Guy R., and Frans Van Vught. Prometheus bound: The changing relationship between government and higher education in Western Europe. Pergamon, 1991.
- Clark, Burton R. and Guy Neave. Encyclopedia of Higher Education. Pergamon Press, 1992.
- Roeland J. in 't Veld, Hans-Peter Füssel, Guy R. Neave. Relations between state and higher education. 1996.

Articles, a selection:

- Neave, Guy. "On the cultivation of quality, efficiency and enterprise: an overview of recent trends in higher education in Western Europe, 1986-1988." European journal of education (1988): 7–23.
- Neave, Guy. "The evaluative state reconsidered." European Journal of education (1998): 265–284.
