= Ingeborg Sølvberg =

Norwegian engineer

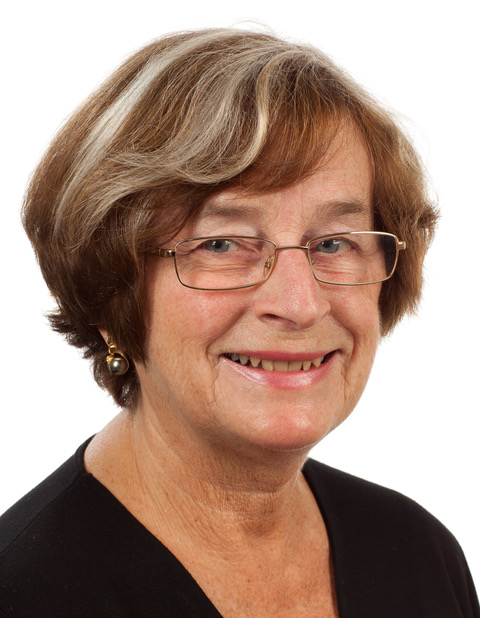
- Born: 1943 (age 82–83)
- Education: Norwegian Institute of Technology
- Known for: Development of BIBSYS
- Spouse: Arne Sølvberg

Ingeborg Sølvberg (born 1943) is a Norwegian engineer.

== Career ==
Graduating from the Norwegian Institute of Technology in 1966, Sølvberg was assigned to the Computing Center at the Norwegian Institute of Technology, and was responsible for the design and implementation of the library information system BIBSYS. The BIBSYS project started in February 1972, and Sølvberg was project leader from 1972 to 1986. As of 2005, 112 libraries were connected to the BIBSYS database.

From 1996, Sølvberg was appointed professor at the Norwegian University of Science and Technology (NTNU).

She is married to professor emeritus at NTNU Arne Sølvberg.
