= Ernst ten Heuvelhof =

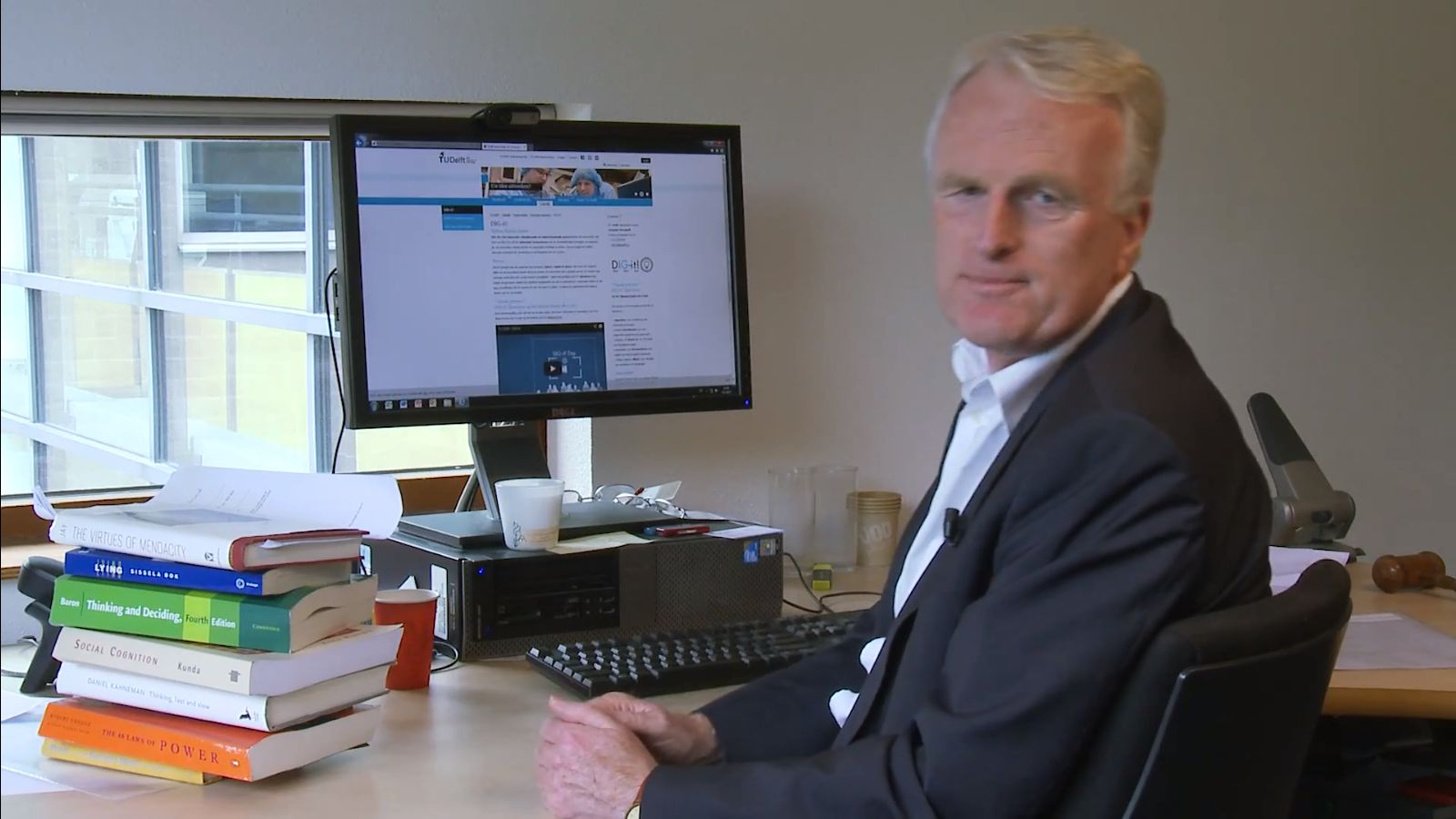
Prof. mr. dr. Ernst ten Heuvelhof, 2014

Ernst Frederik ten Heuvelhof (born 1954 in Rotterdam) is a Dutch organizational theorist, and professor of public administration at the Faculty of Technology, Policy and Management of Delft University of Technology, and professor of public administration at Erasmus University Rotterdam. He is known for his work on process management, policy analysis and complex decision making.

== Biography ==
Ten Heuvelhof obtained his MA in urban planning and in law at the Vrije Universiteit Amsterdam in 1977. In 1982 he received his PhD with a thesis, entitled "Naar een empirische beleidstheorie", on the urban planning of shopping malls.

After graduation worked at the chamber of commerce until 1980. From 1980 to 1992 he work at an urban design consulting firm. In 1986 became part-time assistant professor at the Erasmus University Rotterdam, where he eventually was appointed professor of public administration for one day a week. In 1991 he was appointed professor of public administration at the Delft University of Technology. In the 1990s his research was focused on governance issues in the field of environmental and physical problems.

In 2006 Ten Heuvelhof was awarded the Leermeesterprijs 2006.

== Selected publications ==
- Bruijn, Johan Adam, and Ernst Frederik Heuvelhof. Networks and decision making. Lemma, 2000.
- De Bruijn, Hans, ten Heuvelhof, Ernst, Roel in 't Veld. Process management why project management fails in complex decision making processes. Boston, MA: Kluwer, 2002.

Articles, a selection:

- Heuvelhof, Ernst ten, and Charlotte Nauta. "The effects of environmental impact assessment in the Netherlands." Project appraisal 12.1 (1997): 25–30.
- De Bruijn, Hans, and Ernst ten Heuvelhof. "Policy analysis and decision making in a network: how to improve the quality of analysis and the impact on decision making." Impact Assessment and Project Appraisal 20.4 (2002): 232–242.
- van Bueren, Ellen, and Ernst ten Heuvelhof. "Improving governance arrangements in support of sustainable cities." Environment and planning B: Planning and Design 32.1 (2005): 47–66.
