= Organisational semiotics =

Organisational semiotics, or Organizational Semiotics, examines the nature, characteristics and features of information, and studies how information can be best used in the context of organised activities and business domains. Organisational semiotics treats organisations as information systems in which information is created, processed, distributed, stored and used. It benefits from the research of semiotics in various schools, and further develops its theoretical frameworks, methods and techniques for understanding, analysing, modelling, designing and implementing of information systems. This is used in the research field known as "Algorithmic Governance".

== History ==
Organizational semiotics started around 1973 with Ronald Stamper’s seminal book on Information (Stamper, 1973), a book that was intended to be the first chapter of a book on information systems design called ‘organizational semiotics’.

Featured as an interdisciplinary undertaking, researchers working in the community of organisational semiotics come from different backgrounds and work together on the theoretical and practical issues relating to organisational and technical problems. From the first international meeting on organisational semiotics in 1995, the community aims to develop the subject into a science of information systems, as claimed at the IFIP 8.1 Working Conference. The International Conference on Informatics and Semiotics in Organisations is the flagship conference of the community of which Kecheng Liu and the Informatics Research Centre have been convening over the past years.

== See also ==
- Informatics (academic field)
- Information Systems
- Information management
