= T. William Olle =

British computer scientist and consultant (1933–2019)

Thomas William Olle (April 1933 – 27 March 2019) was a British computer scientist and consultant, and President of T. William Olle Associates in England.

== Life and career ==
Thomas William Olle was born in April 1933. He was educated at Boston Grammar School (1943-1950). He received an M.Sc. degree in 1954 and a Ph.D. degree in 1957, both in Astrophysics at the University of Manchester, which involved extensive programming work on the Manchester University Electronic Computer.

In 1957, he moved to the Netherlands, where he worked in computing for a NATO organization. In 1964, he moved to the United States, where he was employed by Control Data Corporation in Palo Alto, California until 1966. From 1967 to 1971, he was employed by the RCA Corporation in Cherry Hill, New Jersey. In 1972, after a year in Norway, he returned to the UK to establish his own consultancy firm, T. William Olle Associates, specializing in database management applications and information systems methodologies. He consulted clients in Europe, Australia, and Canada, and presented lectures on database topics around the world. He retired in 1993.

Beginning in the 1970s, Olle became active in the CODASYL organization as Chairman of its Systems Committee and spearheaded the preparation of two early analytical reports on "Generalized Database Management Systems". He represented the British Computer Society on IFIP TC8 from its inception in 1977. He was also active in database standards work in ISO and was chairman of the BSI standards committee for many years.

Olle was awarded an honorary doctorate by Middlesex University in 2001.

Olle died in Surrey on 27 March 2019, at the age of 85.

== Work ==
Olle's research interest in the field of computing started in 1953 at the University of Manchester. In the 1960s, he became interested in database applications, and after his retirement in the 1990s, he focused on the history of computing and on "professionalism in the computer field".

== Publications ==
Olle published numerous books and articles. The following is a selection:

- 1971. Feature Analysis of Generalized Data Base Management Systems: technical report Conference on Data Systems Languages Systems Committee.
- 1978. Codasyl approach to data base management.
- 1983. Information Systems Design Methodologies: Improving the Practice. IFIP WG 8.1 Working Conference on Feature Analysis of Information Systems Design Methodologies 1983: York, England. Edited with Henk G. Sol and C. J. Tully.
- 1982. Information Systems Design Methodologies: A Comparative Review. IFIP WG 8.1 Working Conference. Edited with H.G. Sol and A.A. Verrijn Stuart.
- 1988. Computerized Assistance During the Information Systems Life Cycle. Proceedings of the IFIP WG 8.1. Working Conference on Computerized Assistance During the Information Systems Life Cycle, Cris 88, Egham, England, 19–22 September 1988. Edited with A. A. Verrijn Stuart and L. Bhabuta.
- 1988. Information systems methodologies: a framework for understanding. North-Holland.
