= Kjell Samuelson =

Swedish systems scientist

Kjell Samuelson (1932–4 February 2018) was a Swedish systems scientist, Sci-Tech consultant, Professor Emeritus at the Stockholm University and Royal Institute of Technology, and a pioneer of Systems Science & Cybernetics, Communications & Informatics Technology and Global Networks.

== Biography ==
Samuelson held dual Doctors degrees. During four decades he was a distinguished professor at the Stockholm University and the Royal Institute of Technology, where he launched the first graduate education and doctoral program in Informatics & Systems Science including Cybernetics and Networks. He was further a professor of Information Science, Computers, Systems Engineering, Safety & Security, and General Resource Management at a dozen North American Universities.

For several years he was an international Sci-Tech advisor to industries and corporations on large-scale management, organizational redesign, and investments for functional development of new infrastructures. He worked as high-level consultant to UNESCO, OECD, UNITAR, ASEAN, UNIDO etc. on regional development. He was past-president in 1975 of the Society for General Systems Research, now International Systems Science Society, and has fulfilled chair functions of professional consortia and associations such as SGSR, IFIP, ASIS, IEEE, FISCIT, ITCA, ASC, INSIST.

In the early 1970s, he was a member of the International Network Working Group (INWG), out of which came the beginnings of TCP/IP.

== Work ==
Samuelson conducted R & D globally on Total Systems, TeleCom, Satellites, Systems Architecture, Enterprise Planning and Management Structures.

== Publications ==
- 1968. Mechanized information storage, retrieval and dissemination. Proceedings of the F.I.D./I.F.I.P. joint conference, Rome, June 14–17, 1967. Edited by Kjell Samuelson.
- 1969. Automated international information networks. Systems design concepts, goal-setting and priorities. FID/TM Panel at the ASIS meeting in San Francisco, 2 October 1969.
- 1972. Systems, cybernetics and information networks. by K. Samuelson ... [et al.]. Compiled by FID/TM, Stockholm, Sweden.
- 1976. Information and data in systems. With Börje Langefors. New York : Petrocelli/Charter.
- 1976. Information systems and networks : design and planning guidelines of informatics for managers, decision makers and systems analysts. With Harold Borko and G. X. Amey. Amsterdam : North-Holland Pub. Co.
- 1978. Informatics by general systems and cybernetics : a structured methodology for design, anasynthesis, and usage. Stockholm : The Royal Institute of Technology.
