= Hans de Bruijn =

Dutch political scientist

Johan Adam (Hans) de Bruijn (born 1 September 1962) is a Dutch political scientist and Professor of Public Administration at Delft University of Technology, known by his work in the field of process management.

== Life and work ==
Born in Gouda, De Bruijn studied law at Leiden University from 1980 to 1986 and obtained his MA of Dutch Law and his MA of Political Science. In 1986 he started as a PhD student at the Erasmus University Rotterdam, and in 1990 obtained his PhD with thesis, entitled "Economische zaken en economische subsidies: een instrumentele en organisatorische analyse van de toepassing van economische subsidies" (Economic affairs and economic grants: an instrumental and organizational analysis of the application of economic subsidies).

After his graduation De Bruijn started his academic at the Faculty of Technology, Policy and Management of the Delft University of Technology. Since 1998 he is professor of Public Administration, and chairs the section Policy, Organizations, Law & Gaming with Ernst ten Heuvelhof and Helen Stout. In co-operation with Wil Thissen he is involved in research of multi-actor systems. Since 2004 is he affiliated with the Dutch School for Public Administration in The Hague, and since 2008 to the Netherlands Institute for City Innovation Studies.

The Bruijns research interests are in the field of the management and the steering of complex decision-making processes in the public sector.

== Selected publications ==
- Bruijn, Johan Adam, and Ernst Frederik Heuvelhof. Networks and decision making. Lemma, 2000.
- De Bruijn, Hans. Managing Performance in the Public Sector. Routledge, 2001; 2nd ed. 2007 ISBN 978-0415300384.
- De Bruijn, Hans, ten Heuvelhof, Ernst, Roel in 't Veld. Process management why project management fails in complex decision making processes. Boston, MA: Kluwer, 2002.
- Van Wendel de Joode, Ruben, J. A. De Bruijn, and M. J. G. Van Eeten. Protecting the Virtual Commons; Self-organizing open source communities and innovative intellectual property regimes. Information Technology & Law Series, TMC Asser Press, The Hague (2003).

Articles, a selection:

- De Bruijn, Hans, and Ernst ten Heuvelhof. "Policy analysis and decision making in a network: how to improve the quality of analysis and the impact on decision making." Impact Assessment and Project Appraisal 20.4 (2002): 232–242.
