= G. M. Nijssen =

Dutch computer scientist (born 1938)

- Born: Gerardus Maria "Sjir" Nijssen; October 18, 1938 (age 87); Schinnen
- Occupations: Former university professor; Consultant; Author
- Known for: Founder of verbalization in computer science; One of the founders of: Business Modeling &; Information Analysis based on natural language

Gerardus Maria "Sjir" Nijssen (born 18 October 1938, Schinnen) is a Dutch computer scientist, former professor of computer science at the University of Queensland, consultant, and author. Nijssen is considered the founder of verbalization in computer science, and one of the founders of business modeling and information analysis based on natural language.

== Biography ==
Nijssen finished his study at the Eindhoven University of Technology in 1965, and started working at Philips at the department of Commercial Efficiency Research. From 1968 to 1970 he has been director of the educational institute "The Dutch Centre for Business and IT". In 1970 he moved to the Control Data Corporation, a pioneer in the field of computer science with the European headquarters in Brussels in Belgium. In those years he started fact-based modeling and developed NIAM. During this time, he was also associated with several academic institutions and international standards organizations. In 1974 he was co-founder of the IFIP WG 2.6 Database Experts group, where he served as its first chairman until 1983. He was also a member of IFIP WG 8.1 on Information Systems and a member of ISO TC97/SC5/WG3 working group on Conceptual Schemas.

During the period of 1982 to 1989 Nijssen was a full-time professor of Computer science at the University of Queensland in Brisbane, Australia, where he worked together with Terry Halpin amongst others in further developing NIAM. When returning to the Netherlands in 1989, he founded PNA Group, which stands for Professor Nijssen Associates, and accepted a position at the University of Maastricht, Netherlands.

In 2002 Nijssen retired as CEO at PNA Group. He remained active as member of the OMG SBVR 1.1 Revision Task Force (RTF), the OMG BPMN Revision Task Force (RTF), the OMG Architecture Ecosystem Special Interest Group (AE SIG) and the Fact Based Modeling Task Force.

== Work ==
Nijssen's research interests in the field of computer science have developed over the years. In the 1970s he was focussed on information systems and database technology.

=== NIAM ===
At Control Data early 1970s Nijssen started with fact-based modeling and developed NIAM, a fact based business practice and notation. The acronym NIAM originally stood for "Nijssen's Information Analysis Methodology", and later generalised to "Natural language Information Analysis Methodology" and Binary Relationship Modeling since G. M. Nijssen was only one of many people involved in the development of the method.

=== Conceptual schema and relational database design, 1989 ===
In 1989 Nijssen and Terry Halpin published 'the book Conceptual schema and relational database design: a fact oriented approach. The introduction it declared the background of this work:

"Prof. G. M. Nijssen, the originator of NIAM design method, had for a long time given a higher priority to working on new aspects of the method and advancing it, than to writing a textbook about it; but at last, here it is. The NIAM method was initiated in the early 1970s, at a time when most researchers in the data base and information system field still were discussing data modeling on the level of record structures. Only a few acknowledged the need for semantic data modeling. Among these few was Prof. Nijssen, who realized its enormous potential for the practice of data base and information system development..."

The introduction further explained, that NIAM was further developed in cooperation with several other scientists, such as with E.D. Falkenberg. Nijssen and Halpin stipulated:

"... the numerous fruitful discussions which ... with Prof. E.D. Falkenberg, while he was at the University of Stuttgart, Siemens Research center and at the University of Queensland. Some of these discussions were enjoyed in "high places", such as the Rigi and Saas Fee, in Switzerland. Various ideas contained in the NIAM design method were originated by Prof. Falkenberg, for example, the basic set of concepts and some aspects of the design procedure, including an algorithm for designing subtypes."

Nijssen and Halpin further explain:

"While the "great debate" in 1974 between proponents of the CODASYL Network Model (C. W. Bachman) and of the Relational Model (Dr E. F. Codd) was the focus of attention in database research world, it was Prof. Falkenberg who said that: The debate is irrelevant for semantic data modeling. Now, years later, the debate on semantic data modeling is indeed concerned with issues quite different from those emphasised in the conventional data models."

=== CogNIAM ===
Back in the Netherlands in the 1990s Nijssen developed Cognition enhanced Natural language Information Analysis Method (CogNIAM). Hereby he focused entirely on the most productive protocol for the development of business requirements and integrated business modeling.

== Publications ==
Nijssen published more than 50 articles and 7 books.

- Nijssen, G. M. (ed.) Modelling in Data Base Management Systems: Proceedings of the IFIP Working Conference on Modelling in Data Base Management Systems. Elsevier/North-Holland. 1978.
- Bracchi, Giampio, and Gerardus Maria Nijssen, eds. Data Base Architecture: Proceedings of the IFIP Working Conference on Data Base Architecture, Venice, Italy, 26–29 June 1979. North-Holland, 1979.
- Nijssen, Gerardus Maria, and Terence Aidan Halpin. Conceptual Schema and Relational Database Design: a fact oriented approach. Prentice-Hall, Inc., 1989.

Articles, a selection

- Nijssen, G. M. "A Gross Architecture for the Next Generation Database Management System." IFIP Working Conference on Modelling in Data Base Management Systems. 1976.
- Nijssen, G. M. "Current issues in conceptual schema concepts." Architecture and Models in Data Base Management Systems (1977): 31–66.
- Leung, C. M. R., and G. M. Nijssen. "Relational database design using the NIAM conceptual schema." Information Systems 13.2 (1988): 219–227.
- Nijssen, G. M. "An axiom and architecture for information systems." in: E.D. Falkenberg and P. Lindgren (eds.) Information Systems Concepts: an in-depth analysis, North-Holland (1989).
