= Börje Langefors =

Swedish computer scientist (1915–2009)

Börje Langefors (Swedish: [ˈbœ̌rjɛ ˈlâŋːɛˌfɔʂ]; 21 May 1915 – 13 December 2009) was a Swedish engineer and computer scientist, Emeritus Professor of Business Information Systems at the Department of Computer and Systems Science, Stockholm University and Royal Institute of Technology, Stockholm, and "one of those who made systems development a science."

== Biography ==
Langefors was born in Ystad, Sweden, in 1915, and received his training from the Royal Institute of Technology, Stockholm. He started his career in Nordic Armature Factories (NAF) industries, and in 1949 he got recruited for the SAAB aircraft company. In 1965 he went to Stockholm and was stationed at the University at the Department of Mathematical Statistics. From 1967 to 1980 he was Professor of Business Information Systems at the Department of Computer and Systems Science, Stockholm University and Royal Institute of Technology, Stockholm.

In 1974/75 he has been a fellow at the Netherlands Institute for Advanced Study in Wassenaar, the Netherlands, where he completed the writing of a book "Information and Control in Organizations" on Information Systems Architecture. Furthermore, Langefors was one of the key players in founding the IFIP TC8 Technical Committee of Information Systems in 1976.

Among his former students and later colleagues in Stockholm were Janis Bubenko, Göran Goldkuhl, John Impagliazzo, Kristo Ivanov & Arne Sølvberg. In 1999 he received the LEO Award of the Association for Information Systems for his lifetime achievement.

In commemoration of his contribution in the field of IS, a book was published with the title The Infological Equation: Essays in Honor of Börje Langefors. An annual award titled Börje Langeforspriset has been announced by the Swedish Information Systems Academy since 2011 for the best doctoral dissertation in Sweden.

== Work ==
A major achievement of his work is the formulation of the 'infological equation' describing the difference between data and information as follows:

I = i(D, S, t)

This is a mathematical expression for the observation, that the information "I" communicated by a set of data to humans in an information system is a function "i" of the data "D", the semantic background "S", and the time interval "t" of the communication.

== Publications ==
Langefors published numerous papers in journals, books, and archival proceedings since the 1970s. Books, a selection:

- 1966. Theoretical analysis of information systems. Studentlitteratur, Lund.
- 1975. Information systems architecture. With Bo Sundgren. Petrocelli/Charter.
- 1977. Information and Data in Systems. With Kjell Samuelson.
- 1986. Trends in information systems: an anthology of papers from conferences of the IFIP Technical Committee 8 "Information Systems" to commemorate their tenth anniversary. With A. A. Verrijn Stuart and Giampio Bracchi. International Federation for Information Processing. Technical Committee for Information Systems.
- 1996. Essays on Infology
