= Kecheng Liu =

Chinese/British computer scientist

- Born: 1957 (age 68–69); Jiangsu, China
- Occupation: Academic
- Title: Professor

Academic background
- Education: University of the Chinese Academy of Sciences, University of Twente

Academic work
- Discipline: Applied informatics
- Institutions: University of Reading

Kecheng Liu (born 1957) is a Chinese-British expert in organisational semiotics who is a professor of applied informatics at the University of Reading, and a professor of management science and engineering.

== Early years and education ==
Born in Jiangsu, China, Liu received his B.A. degree in computer science in 1982 at the University of the Chinese Academy of Sciences. In the Netherlands, he received his MSc in Decision Support Systems in 1989 at the International Institute for Aerospace Survey and Earth Sciences, and his Ph.D. in information management in 1993 at the University of Twente with a doctoral thesis entitled "Semiotics applied to information systems development".

== Career ==
After graduation in 1993, Liu became a faculty member at the School of Computing of the Staffordshire University. In 2003 he moved to the Department of Computer Science of the University of Reading. By 2005 he was appointed professor of informatics and e-business at the University of Reading. Liu is a Fellow of British Computer Society. and Fellow of Charted Institute of Management and Senior Fellow of Higher Education Academy. He is currently the Director for Strategic Initiatives, Henley Business School of the University of Reading. He is the founding Head of School of Business Informatics, Systems and Accounting (2011–2016) which consists of two departments: Informatics and Systems, and Accounting and Financial Management. He also founded and is now the Honorary Director of Informatics Research Centre (2014 to date), and was Deputy Director of Technologies for Sustainable Built Environments (2009–2013), both being multidisciplinary research centres within the University of Reading. He is now mainly based in Wuhan, Hubei Province, China, serving as the Executive Vice President of Wuhan College, a private university with more than 12,000 students.

He has been visiting professor at the Renmin University of China, Graduate School of the Chinese Academy of Sciences, the Fudan University and Beijing Institute of Technology, where he is also a PhD supervisor. He also has had similar visiting positions at the Southeast University, Beijing Jiaotong University, Dalian University of Technology, and Shanghai University of Finance and Economics. He has been invited to deliver lectures in information systems and semiotics in China, Australia, Czech, France, Holland, Hong Kong, Portugal, Spain, Chile and Brazil. He is member of Senior Board of IBG (British Intelligent Buildings Group) and senior advisor on digital hospital in a governmental healthcare organisation in China.

== Work ==
Liu's research interests in early 2000s have been in the field of "requirements studies, information systems analysis and design, object methods for systems engineering, normative modelling of software agents, e-commerce systems, digital strategy and leadership."

More recently, these interests has shifted towards "organisational semiotics, requirements studies, enterprise information systems management and engineering, business processing modelling, alignment of business and IT strategies, co-design of business and IT systems, pervasive informatics and intelligent spaces for working and living."

== Publications ==
Liu has authored and co-authored over 200 publications in his field of expertise.

=== Books ===
- Kecheng Liu, Weizi Li (2015), Organisational Semiotics and Business Informatics, Routledge, London and New York.
- Liu, K., Nakata, K., Li, W., Galarreta, D. (2015, eds.) Information and Knowledge Management in Complex Systems, 6th IFIP WG 8.1 International Conference on Informatics and Semiotics in Organisations, Springer, ISBN 978-3-319-16274-4
- Kecheng Liu, Stephen Richard Gulliver, Weizi Li, Changrui Yu (2014, eds) Service Science and Knowledge Innovation, The 15th International Conference on Informatics and Semiotics in Organisations (ICISO2014), IFIP TC8/WG8.1 Working Conference, Springer.
- Zhang, R., Zhang, Z., Liu, K., Zhang, J. (2013, eds.) Proceedings of 3rd International Conference on Logistics, Informatics and Service Science, Springer, ISBN 978-3-642-40660-7.
- Kecheng Liu, Weizi Li, Stephen Gulliver (2013, editors) Web of Things, People and Information Systems, Proceeding of 14th International Conference of Informatics an Semiotics in Organisations (ICISO2013), Scitepress, ISBN 978-989-8565-51-8.
- Ana Fred, Jan Dietz, Kecheng Liu, Joaquim Filipe (2013, Editors) Knowledge Discovery, Knowledge Engineering and Knowledge Management, revised selected papers from 2nd International Joint Conference IC3K, Springer.* 1993. Semiotics Applied to Information Systems Development Doctoral thesis, University of Twente, Enschede
- Kecheng Liu, (2000) Semiotics in Information Systems Engineering. Cambridge University Press, Cambridge

=== Articles, a selection ===
- Stamper, R., Liu, K., Hafkamp, M., & Ades, Y. (2000). Understanding the roles of signs and norms in organisations-a semiotic approach to information systems design. Behaviour & Information Technology, 19(1), 15–27.
- Suri, Jasjit S., et al. "Shape recovery algorithms using level sets in 2-D/3-D medical imagery: a state-of-the-art review." Information Technology in Biomedicine, IEEE Transactions on 6.1 (2002): 8–28.
- Luo, Yuan, Kecheng Liu, and Darryl N. Davis. "A multi-agent decision support system for stock trading." IEEE Network 16.1 (2002): 20–27.
