= Arne Sølvberg =

Norwegian computer scientist

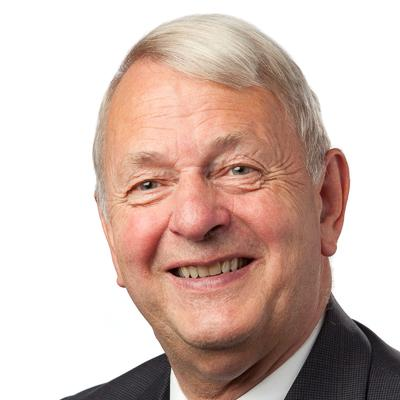
Arne Sølvberg

Arne Sølvberg (born 13 February 1940) is a Norwegian computer scientist, professor in computer science at the Norwegian University of Science and Technology (NTNU) in Trondheim, Norway, and an expert in the field of information modelling.

== Career ==
Sølvberg was born at Klepp Municipality in southwestern Norway. He was the eldest of five, with three brothers and a sister. He received a M.Sc. in applied physics in 1963 from the Norwegian Institute of Technology, now the Norwegian University of Science and Technology (NTNU). In 1971 at NTH he received a Ph.D. in computer science with the thesis "Matematiske metoder for generering og oppfølging av kortsiktige salgsprognoser". Under the guidance of Börje Langefors (born 1915), professor of Business Information Systems at Stockholm University, he had received the first doctoral degree in computer science at Trondheim.

Between 1963 and 1974 Sølvberg worked at SINTEF Runnit building up and leading their information systems group. In 1974 he became the first professor of computer science at NTNU, in the computer science department, which was established two years earlier. and since 2002 he is also dean of NTNU’s Faculty of Information Technology, Mathematics and Electrical Engineering as well. He has been a visiting scientist with IBM Almaden Research Center, The University of Florida, The Naval Postgraduate School, The University of California, Santa Barbara and most recently with the University of California at Los Angeles. He is a fellow of the Norwegian Academy of Technological Sciences.

Active in international organizations working toward cooperation in research, from 1979 to 1982 Sølvberg represented Norway at the IFIP General Assembly. From 1982 to 1988, he was chairman of IFIP WG8.1 for Information Systems Design. Until 1994 he served as a trustee in the VLDB Endowment. He cofounded the CAiSE conference series.

He is married to Ingeborg Sølvberg.

== Work ==
Sølvberg's main research interests are in the fields of information systems design methodology, database design, information modelling, information systems engineering environments and model driven design.

== Publications ==
Sølvberg has published numerous papers in journals, books, and archival proceedings since the 1970s. Books, a selection:

- 1967. Datamaskinen.
- 1969. Fortran.
- 1971. Computer-aided information systems analysis and design. The first Scandinavian workshop. With Janis Bubenko and Börje Langefors (Eds).
- 1990. CAiSE '90 (1990 : Stockholm, Sweden) Advanced information systems engineering : second Nordic conference, CAiSE '90, Stockholm, Sweden, May 8-10, 1990 : proceedings. With B. Steinholtz and L. Bergman (eds.)
- 1993. An Introduction to Information Systems Engineering. With David Kung. Springer-Verlag.
- 2000. Information systems engineering: state of the art and research themes. With Sjaak Brinkkemper, Janis Bubenko and Eva Lindencrona.
- 2001. International Conference on Conceptual Modeling (20th : 2001 : Yokohama, Japan) Conceptual modeling-ER 2001 : 20th International Conference on Conceptual Modeling, Yokohama, Japan, November 2001 : proceedings. With Hideko S. Kunii and Sushil Jajodia (eds.).
- 2003. Working Conference on the History of Nordic Computing (1st : 2003 : Trondheim, Norway) History of Nordic computing : IFIP WG9.7 First Working Conference on the History of Nordic Computing (HiNC1), June 16-18, 2003, Trondheim, Norway. Edited with Janis Bubenko, Jr. and John Impagliazzo.
- 2007. Conceptual modelling in information systems engineering With John Krogstie, Andreas Lothe Opdahl and Sjaak Brinkkemper (eds.).

Articles, a selection:

- Eivind Aurdal, Arne Sølvberg (1977). "A multi-level procedure for design of file organizations". In: AFIPS National Computer Conference 1977 pp. 509-521.
- Arne Sølvberg, David Chenho Kung (1985). "On Structural and Behavioral Modeling of Reality". In: DS-1 1985. pp. 205-221
- O.I. Lindland, G. Sindre and Arne Sølvberg (1994) "Understanding quality in conceptual modeling". In: IEEE Software 11(2), pp. 42–49
