= TU Delft Faculty of Technology, Policy and Management =

Division of Delft University of Technology, Netherlands

Faculty of Technology, Policy and Management
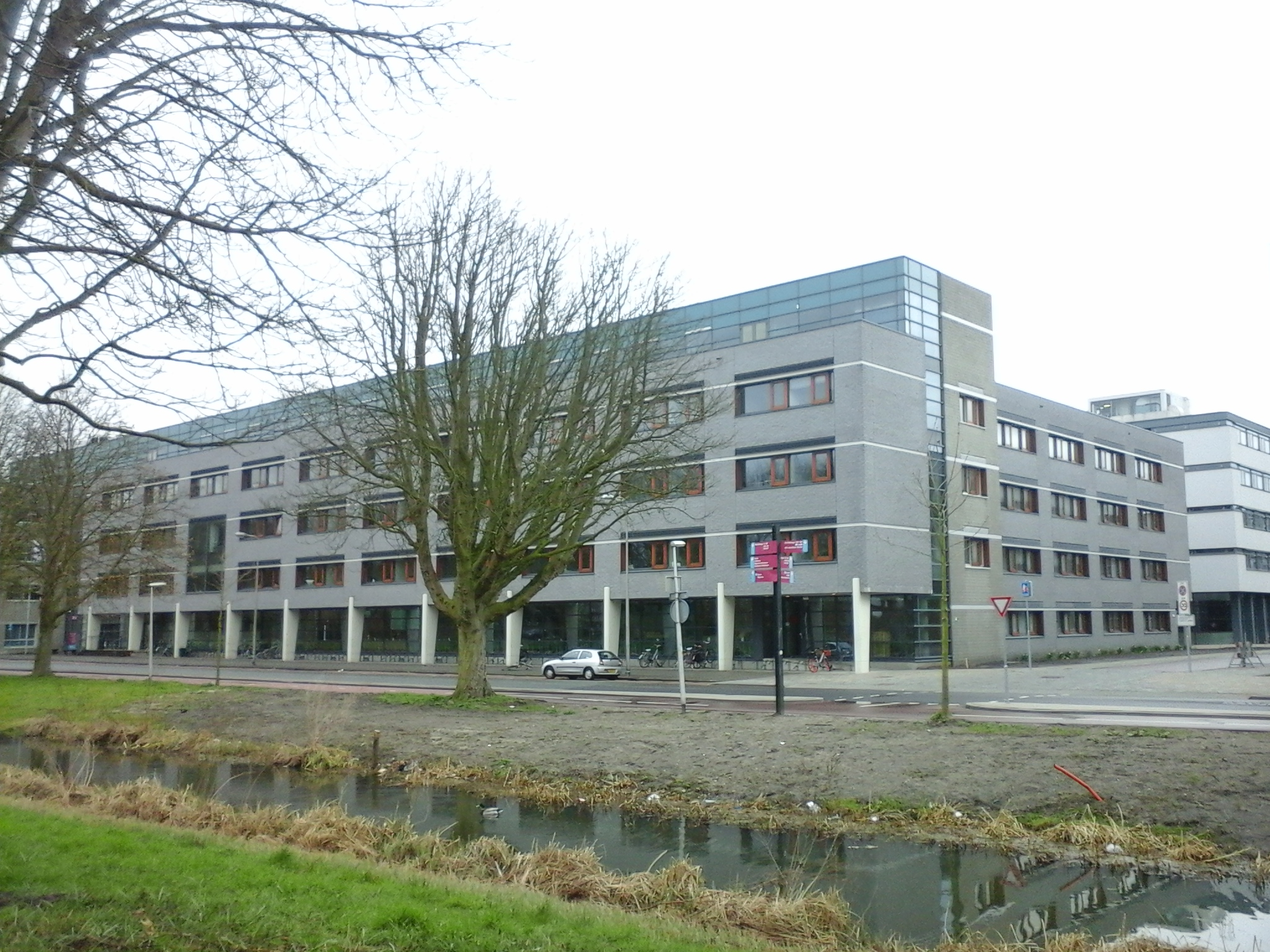
- Type: Public
- Established: 1997
- Dean: Prof.drs. A.S. (Aukje) Hassoldt
- Location: Delft, Netherlands
- Website: www.tudelft.nl/en/tpm/

The TU Delft Faculty of Technology, Policy and Management is a faculty for graduation and post-graduation studies in Technology, Policy and Management of the Delft University of Technology. Through internationally oriented education and research the faculty want to contribute with "sustainable solutions to complex social problems". The research of the faculty focuses on "large scale socio-technical systems, such as infrastructures for transport, energy and telecommunication".

== History ==
The faculty started in 1997 from a merger between the two existing faculties of the Delft University of Technology at the time: Technology and Society and Systems Engineering, Policy Analysis and Management.

The Faculty of Technology and Society (Dutch: Faculteit der Wijsbegeerte en Technische Maatschappijwetenschappen (WTM)) had been a joint faculty from the 1960s. It originated in the faculty of General Science, which was initiated with the foundation of the Delft University of Technology in 1905. It initially contained physics, mathematics and social sciences. An independent physics department was founded in the 1920s, and the remaining faculty of General Science was split in two in the 1965. The Faculty of Technology and Society including philosophy, economics, skills, technology assessment, law and gender studies. Notable faculty members in those days were Joop Doorman, Henk Lombaers and Pierre Malotaux. The faculties main task was to provide service education to all the other faculties of the Delft University of Technology.

The Faculty of Systems Engineering, Policy Analysis and Management was built from scratch and started in 1992 with a new curriculum and research programme. From 1992 to 1998 Henk G. Sol was founding Dean of the new School for Engineering, Policy Analysis and Management. He prepared the merger, in 1998, into the Faculty of Technology, Policy and Management.

== Organization ==
The faculty has evolved three departments with three sections each. These are:

- Engineering Systems and Services department
  - Energy and Industry
  - Information and Communication Technology
  - Transport and Logistics
- Multi Actor Systems department
  - Policy Analysis
  - Policy, Organisation, Law and Gaming
  - Systems Engineering and Simulation
- Values, Technology and Innovation department
  - Ethics/Philosophy of Technology
  - Safety and Security Science
  - Economics of Technology and Innovation

=== Programs offered ===
The faculty offers the following bachelor programme, which is taught in Dutch, entitled "Technische Bestuurskunde." The faculty offers the following five master programmes, which are taught in English:

- Engineering and Policy Analysis (EPA)
- Complex Systems Engineering and Management (COSEM)
- Management of Technology (MOT)
- Transport, Infrastructure & Logistics (TIL)
- Industrial Ecology (joint-degree with Leiden University)

== Academics affiliated ==
Past and/or present academics affiliated with TU Delft Faculty of Technology, Policy and Management:

- Ciano Aydin
- Kornelis Blok
- Harry Bouwman
- Karel Brookhuis
- Hans de Bruijn
- Michel van Eeten
- Neelke Doorn
- Marina van Geenhuizen
- Vic Hayes
- Dirk Helbing
- Ernst ten Heuvelhof
- Jeroen van den Hoven
- Marijn Janssen
- Martin de Jong
- Peter Kroes
- Rolf Künneke
- Zofia Lukszo
- Ibo van de Poel
- Hugo Priemus
- Sabine Roeser
- Henk G. Sol
- Yao-Hua Tan
- Wil Thissen
- Rene Wagenaar
- Alexander Verbraeck
- Marc de Vries
- Hans Wamelink
- Bartel van de Walle
- Margot Weijnen
