= Anthony Morgan of Marshfield and Casebuchan =

Royalist officer

Anthony Morgan (born 1627) Marshfield and Casebuchan, Monmouthshire, was a Royalist officer during the English Civil War.

In 1642 he entered the service of Henry, Earl of Worcester, for which his estate was sequestered. He begged to have the third of his estate, on the plea of never having "intermeddled in the wars". but his name was ordered by Parliament to be inserted in the bill for sale of delinquents' estates.
