= Gert Hauske =

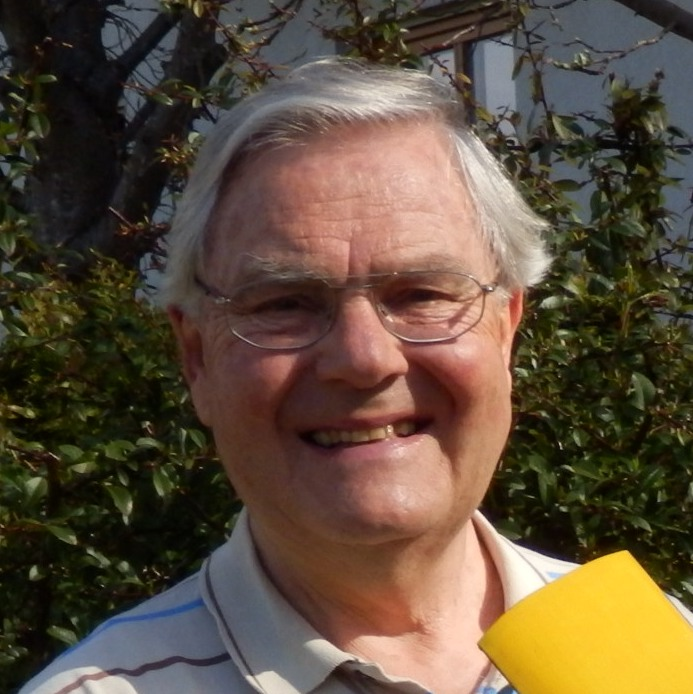
Gert Hauske, 2023

Gert Hauske (born 1940) is a German engineer and Emeritus Associate Professor at the Institute for Communications Engineering, Technical University of Munich. He is known for his work in the field of vision research, especially focussed on a system theory of visual perception.

== Biography ==
Gert Hauske studied electrical engineering at the Technical University of Munich (Germany). He received the diploma degree 1965 and the doctoral degree 1968. Habilitation for “Cybernetics” followed 1972. He had a research sabbatical 1974 at the University of California, Berkeley (United States) in cooperation with Gerald Westheimer.

After his return 1976 he was appointed Professor of “System Theory of Visual Perception” at the Institut für Nachrichtentechnik. Gert Hauskes research interests are in the field of modelling visual perception in relation to detection and localization, and the processing, storing and compressing of image data.

== Selected publications ==
- Gert Hauske. Systemtheorie der visuellen Wahrnehmung, Book, Teubner-Verlag, 1994

Articles

- G. Hauske: Stochastische und rhythmische Eigenschaften spontan auftretender Verhaltensweisen von Fischen. Kybernetik 4, 26-36 (1967).
- G. Hauske: Performance of single letters and pairs of letters in short-term recognition experiments. ybernetik 9, 140-144 (1971).
- G. Hauske: Adaptive filter mechanisms in human vision. Kybernetik 16, 227-237 (1974).
- G. Westheimer, G. Hauske: Temporal and spatial interference with vernier acuity. Vision Res. 15, 1137-1141 (1975).
- G. Hauske, W. Wolf, U. Lupp: Matched filters in human vision. Biol. Cybernetics 22, 181-188 (1976).
- U. Lupp, G. Hauske, W. Wolf: Perceptual latencies to sinusoidal gratings. Vision Res. 16, 969-972 (1976).
- W. Wolf, G. Hauske, U. Lupp: Interaction of pre- and postsaccadic pattern having the same coordinates in space. Vision Res. 20, 117-125 (1980).
- G. Hauske, U. Lupp, W. Wolf: Comparison of two methods to analyse temporal properties of the visual system. Invest. Ophthalmol. Vis. Sci. 22 (ARVO Suppl.), 253 (1982).
- W. Xu, G. Hauske: Picture quality evaluation based on error segmentation. In: Proc. SPIE Conf. on Visual Communications and Image Processing (1994).
- Krieger, G., Rentschler, I., Hauske, G., Schill, K., & Zetzsche, C. (2000). "Object and scene analysis by saccadic eye-movements: an investigation with higher-order statistics." Spatial Vision, 13(2), 201–214.
