= Semantic analysis (knowledge representation) =

Semantic analysis is a method for eliciting and representing knowledge about organisations.

Initially the problem must be defined by domain experts and passed to the project analyst(s). The next step is the generation of candidate affordances. This step will generate a list of semantic units that may be included in the schema. The candidate grouping follows where some of the semantic units that will appear in the schema are placed in simple groups. Finally the groups will be integrated together into an ontology chart.

Semantic analysis always starts from the problem definition which if not clear, require the analyst to employ relevant literature, interviews with the stakeholders and other techniques towards collecting supplementary information. All assumptions made must be genuine and not limiting the system.

== See also ==
- Semantic analysis (machine learning)
- Ontology chart
