= Terry Halpin =

Australian computer scientist

- Born: 1950s Australia
- Education: University of Queensland
- Scientific career
- Fields: Computer scientist

Terence Aidan (Terry) Halpin (born 1950s) is an Australian computer scientist who is known for his formalization of the object–role modeling notation.

== Biography ==
Born in Australia, Halpin studied at the University of Queensland starting in the 1970s and eventually received a BSc, DipEd, BA, MLitStud and in 1989 a PhD with the thesis "A logical analysis of information systems : static aspects of the data-oriented perspective" under John Staples.

In the 1970s he started working at the University of Queensland at the Key Centre for Software Technology at the Department of Computer Science, which he combined with some work in industry on database modeling.

In the 1990s he moved to industry heading the database research at multiple software companies, including Visio Corporation. When this company was acquired by Microsoft he became Program Manager in Database Modeling, and worked on the "conceptual and logical database modeling technology in Microsoft Visio for Enterprise Architects".

In the new millennium back in academia he was Professor at Neumont University, focusing on "business rules approach to informatics". In 2009 he switched back to industry becoming a Principal Scientist at LogicBlox, and became a part-time Professor at INTI International University in Malaysia.

Halpin is a member of IFIP WG 8.1 (Design and Evaluation of Information Systems). He has been editor for multiple academic journals. And he several workshops and conferences on modeling both industry and academia.

He received the DAMA International Academic Achievement Award in 2003, the IFIP Outstanding Service Award, in 2006, and the ER Fellow Award in 2024.

== Work ==
Halpin's research interest is in the field of "conceptual modeling and conceptual query technology for information systems, using a business rules approach".

An application of Object Role Modeling

=== Object-role modeling ===
With his doctoral thesis Halpin (1989) formalized object-role modeling (ORM), a "method for designing and querying database models at the conceptual level, where the application is described in terms easily understood by non-technical users".

== Publications ==
Halpin has authored ten books and over 200 technical papers. A selection of books:

- 1978. Inductive and Practical Reasoning. With Rod Girle, Corinne Miller & Geoff Williams. Rotecoge,
- 1981. Deductive Logic, 2nd edn. With Rod Girle. Logiqpress.
- 1989. Conceptual Schema and Relational Database Design. With G.M. Nijssen. Prentice Hall, Sydney. ISBN 978-0-13-167263-5
- 2001. Information Modeling and Relational Databases: From Conceptual Analysis to Logical Design. Morgan Kaufmann. ISBN 1-55860-672-6.
- 2001. Unified Modeling Language: Systems Analysis, Design and Development Issues. With Keng Siau (editors). ISBN 978-1-930708-05-1
- 2003. Database Modeling with Microsoft Visio for Enterprise Architects. With Ken Evans, Pat Hallock, & Bill MacLean. Morgan Kaufmann.
- 2005. Information Modeling Methods and Methodologies. With John Krogstie and Keng Siau (editors).
- 2008. Information Modeling and Relational Databases. Second Edition. With Tony Morgan. Morgan Kaufmann. ISBN 978-0-12-373568-3.
- 2024. Information Modeling and Relational Databases. Third Edition. With Tony Morgan. Morgan Kaufmann. ISBN 978-0-443-23790-4.
