= Tony Morgan (computer scientist) =

Antony J. (Tony) Morgan (born c. 1944) is a British computer scientist, data modeling consultant, and Professor in computer science at INTI International University. He is known for his work on (2002) "Business rules and information systems," and the 2010 "Information modeling and relational databases," co-authored with Terry Halpin.

== Life and work ==
Morgan obtained his BA in Earth Sciences from The Open University, his BSc in Computer Systems Engineering from Coventry University, where in 1984 he also obtained his MSc in Control Engineering. In 1988 he obtained his PhD, Computer Science from University of Cambridge with a thesis on automated decision-making using qualitative reasoning.

Morgan started his career in industry and worked on "projects in Europe and the US with companies such as Unisys and EDS (now part of Hewlett-Packard) across diverse industries such as Government, Transportation, Aerospace and Financial Services." In the late 1990s he worked for SD-Scicon PLC, which was affiliated with the National Computing Centre in Manchester. In 1988 he co-edited "Blackboard Systems. The Insight Series in Artificial Intelligence" with Robert S. Engelmore (1935-2003), and in the early 1990s he published several articles on artificial intelligence and simulation. From 1997 to 2002 he was Senior Consultant at Unisys.

In 2003 he was appointed Professor in computer science and vice president of Enterprise Informatics at Neumont University, and in 2010 he moved to the INTI International University in Malaysia, where he is appointed Professor of computer science.

Morgans research interests focus on "business rules and business processes and the rapid development of high-quality information systems."

== Work ==
=== Business Rules and Information Systems, 2002 ===
In the 2002 "Business Rules and Information Systems," Morgan argued that "Information systems often fail because their requirements are poorly defined." The work is intended to show "IT professionals how to specify more precisely and more effectively what their systems need to do. The key lies in the discovery and application of what are called business rules."

A business rule is defined by Morgan as a "compact and simple statement that represents some important aspect of a business. By capturing the rules for your business--the logic that governs its operation--you will gain the ability to create systems fully aligned with your business needs."

=== Business architecture ===
In "Business Rules and Information Systems," Morgan (2002) described business architecture as "a way of describing businesses and what they do or intend to do in the future. The building blocks available represent various aspects of the business. No single aspect is the most important; all are necessary to give a balanced picture of what a business is all about. We can use the business architecture to produce business models: descriptions of specific businesses, couched in a consistent and well-defined vocabulary. The business architecture corresponds reasonably to the Conceptual viewpoint in the Zachman Framework."

== Selected publications ==
- Engelmore, Robert, and Tony Morgan eds.. Blackboard systems. Addison Wesley Publishing Company, 1988.
- Morgan, Tony. Business rules and information systems: aligning IT with business goals. Addison-Wesley Professional, 2002.
- Halpin, Terry, and Tony Morgan. Information modeling and relational databases. Morgan Kaufmann, 2010.

Articles, a selection:

- Balsters, H.; Carver, A.; Halpin, T.; Morgan, T. (2006). "Modeling Dynamic Rules in ORM". On the Move to Meaningful Internet Systems 2006: OTM 2006 Workshops. OTM 2006. Lecture Notes in Computer Science. Vol. 4278. Springer. pp. 1201–10. doi:10.1007/11915072_23. ISBN 978-3-540-48276-5.
