= Rene Wagenaar =

Dutch academic (1954–2007)

René Wijnand Wagenaar (1954 – February 25, 2007) was a Dutch academic, and Professor of Information and Communication Technology at the Faculty of Technology, Policy and Management of the Delft University of Technology, known for his work on Modular Network Design and shared service centers.

== Biography ==
Born in Amsterdam, Wagenaar obtained his BSc in economics from the Free University Amsterdam, and his PhD in experimental physics from the University of Amsterdam in 1984 with the thesis, entitled "Small angle elastic scattering of electrons by noble gas atom."

After graduation he started his career in industry as computer network architect at Philips in Eindhoven and Sunnyvale, California. Back in The Netherlands he was appointed lecturer in ICT at the Faculty of Economics of the Erasmus University Rotterdam, where in 1989 he was appointed Associate Professor in Business Telecommunications at the Faculty of Management.

In 1996 he moved back to industry, starting at the telecom company KPN in corporate R&D strategy. Also at the Free University of Amsterdam, he was appointed part-time Professor in "Teleservices, in particular their economic aspects." In 2001 he was appointed Professor of Information and Communication Technology at the Faculty of Technology, Policy and Management of the Delft University of Technology.

== Work ==
=== Impact of electronic communication on trade and transport chains ===
At the Erasmus University Rotterdam in the 1990s Wagenaar set up a new research program into "the impact of electronic communication and EDI within trade and transport chains, which resulted in a large number of publications. In addition, he developed the concept for the management simulation game called "Port of Rotterdam", which became very popular in the business community."

=== Shared service centers ===
In the Netherland Rene Wagenaar and Hans Strikwerda are recognized as "pioneers in the field of implementing shared service centers in public administration."

At KPN since 1996 Wagenaar and Harry Bouwman worked together, and "initiated several research projects and business development initiatives at policy level in the public sector."

== Selected publications ==
- Nunen, Jo van, Hans van der Heijden & Rene Wagenaar. Organisational redesign through telecommunications exploring authority shifts in agency relationships, 1993.
- Saxena, K. B. C., and René Wijnand Wagenaar. Critical success factors of EDI technology transfer: A conceptual framework. Erasmus Universiteit/Rotterdam School of Management, Faculteit Bedrijfskunde, 1994.

Articles, a selection:

- Wrigley, Clive D., Rene W. Wagenaar, and Roger A. Clarke. "Electronic data interchange in international trade: frameworks for the strategic analysis of ocean port communities." The Journal of Strategic Information Systems 3.3 (1994): 211-234.
- Bons, R. W., Lee, R. M., Wagenaar, R. W., & Wrigley, C. D. (1995, January). "Modelling inter-organizational trade using Documentary Petri Nets." In System Sciences, 1995. Proceedings of the Twenty-Eighth Hawaii International Conference on System Sciences on (Vol. 3, pp. 189–198). IEEE.
- Bons, Roger WH, Ronald M. Lee, and René W. Wagenaar. "Designing trustworthy interorganizational trade procedures for open electronic commerce." International Journal of Electronic Commerce (1998): 61-83.
- Hoogeweegen, Martijn R., et al. "Modular Network Design: Using Information and Communication Technology to Allocate Production Tasks in a Virtual Organization*." Decision Sciences 30.4 (1999): 1073-1103.
- Janssen, Marijn, and René Wagenaar. "An analysis of a shared services centre in e-government." System Sciences, 2004. Proceedings of the 37th Annual Hawaii International Conference on System Sciences on, IEEE, 2004.
- Janssen, Marijn, and Rene Wagenaar. "Developing generic shared services for e-Government." Electronic Journal of e-Government 2.1 (2004): 31-38.
