= Ontology chart =

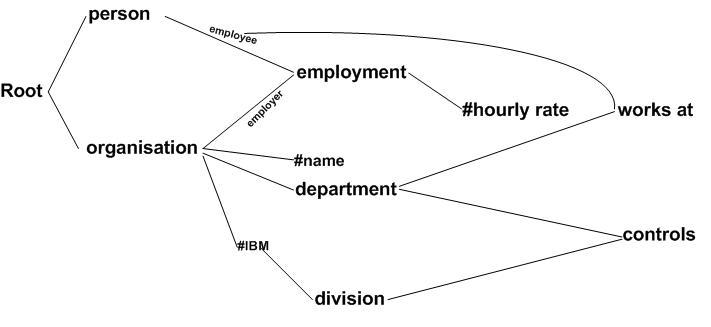
The case study used here to illustrate the transformation process is a slight adaptation of the case used by Bonacin (2004).

An ontology chart is a type of chart used in semiotics and software engineering to illustrate an ontology.

== Overview ==
The nodes of an ontology chart represent universal affordances and rarely represent particulars. The exception is the root which is a particular agent often labelled ‘society’ and located on the extreme left of an ontology chart. The root is often dropped in practice but is implied in every ontology chart. If any other particular is present in an ontology chart it is recognised by the ‘#’ sign prefix and upper case letters. In our ontology chart the node labelled #IBM is a particular organisation.

The arcs represent ontological dependency relations directed from left to right. The right affordance is ontologically dependent on the left affordance. The left affordance is the ontological antecedent of the right affordance. A special category of affordances are determiners. They are recognised by the ‘#’ sign prefix. The two examples above are #hourly rate and #name. All determiners have a second antecedent – the measurement standard. They are usually dropped from the ontology chart but they are implied and obvious. In the case of hourly rate and name they are currency and language respectively. The names on the arcs are role names of the carrier, the left node, in the relationship node on the right. For example, the ‘employee’ is the role name of a person while in employment. No ontology chart node has more than two ontological antecedents. Where you find an arc on the ontology chart between a role name and a node, read that as an arc between the right hand side of the role name. So the arc from employee to works at is an arc between employment and works at

Mathematically, ontology charts are a graphical representation of semi-lattice structures; specifically they are Hasse diagrams of a single root and no cycles. Ontological dependency is a relationship known mathematically as a partial order set relation (poset). Posets are an object of study in the mathematical discipline of order theory. They belong to the class of binary relations but they have three additional properties: reflexivity, anti-symmetry and transitivity.

Ontological dependency is a special poset because it is a binary relation, every thing is ontologically dependent on itself for its existence, two things that are mutually ontologically dependent must be the same thing and if a depends on b and b depends on c then a depends on c. The last of these properties - the transitive property of posets - was exploited by Helmut Hasse to give us the Hasse diagram - a diagram of incredible power, simplicity and if drawn well elegant as well. Because ontology charts have a root that all affordances (realisations/things) are ultimately dependent upon for their existence, they are graphical representation of semi-lattices.

== See also ==
- Semantic analysis (knowledge representation)
- Human Computer Interaction
