= Sjaak Brinkkemper =

Dutch computer scientist

- Born: 18 January 1958 (age 68)
- Occupation: Computer scientist

Jacobus Nicolaas (Sjaak) Brinkkemper (born Monnickendam, 18 January 1958) is a Dutch computer scientist, and Full Professor of organisation and information at the Department of Information and Computing Sciences of Utrecht University.

== Biography ==
Brinkkemper received a BA from the University of Amsterdam in 1980 and an MSc from the Radboud University Nijmegen in 1984, both in Mathematics. In 1990 he received a PhD at the same university with his thesis Formalisation of information systems modelling, supervised by Eckhard Falkenberg and Alex Verrijn Stuart.

In 1984 he became an assistant professor at the department of Informatics at the Radboud University. In 1992 he became associate professor at the University of Twente. In addition, he has been a process architect at Baan from 1996 to 2002 and a consultant at Emendas for another year. Since 2004 Brinkkemper is full professor at Utrecht University, where he leads a group of about twenty researchers specialized in product software development and entrepreneurship.

He is a member of the editorial boards of the journals Business Informatics, European Journal of Information Systems, Journal of Database Management, Journal on Information Systems and e-Business Management, and Management Information Systems Quarterly. Since 1989 he is a member of the International Federation for Information Processing IFIP WG 8.1 working group on information systems design and evaluation.

== Work ==
Brinkkemper's research interests are methodology of product software development, software implementation, methods, requirements management, method engineering, information systems methodology, CASE-tools, and system development tools.

== Publications ==
Brinkkemper has published several books, papers, and articles. Books:

- Sjaak Brinkkemper. Formalisation of information systems modelling. PhD thesis Radboud University, Nijmegen 1990
- Sjaak Brinkkemper and Matti Rossi. Metrics in Method Engineering. 1994.
- Sjaak Brinkkemper, Kalle Lyytinen and Richard J. Welke (eds.). Method engineering: principles of method construction and tool support. International Federation for Information Processing, 1996.
- Sjaak Brinkkemper, Arne Solvberg, Eva Lindencrona. Information systems engineering: state of the art and research themes. London etc. : Springer, 2000.
- Colette Rolland, Sjaak Brinkkemper and Motoshi Saeki (eds.). Engineering information systems in the Internet context. International Federation for Information Processing IFIP TC8/WG8.1, 2002.
- John Krogstie, Andreas Lothe Opdahl, and Sjaak Brinkkemper (eds.). Conceptual Modelling in Information Systems Engineering. Berlin: Springer, 2007. * Jolita Ralyté, Sjaak Brinkkemper, and Brian Henderson-Sellers (eds.). Situational Method Engineering: Fundamentals and Experiences: Proceedings of the IFIP WG 8.1 Working Conference, 12–14 September 2007, Geneva, Switzerland. IFIP Advances in Information and Communication Technology, Vol. 244. Berlin: Springer, 2007.

Articles, a selection:

- Foorthuis, R. & Brinkkemper, S. (July 2008). "Best Practices for Business and Systems Analysis in Projects Conforming to Enterprise Architecture". Enterprise Modelling and Information Systems Architecture. 3 (1): 36–47.
