= Artifact-centric business process model =

Operational model of business processes

Artifact-centric business process model represents an operational model of business processes in which the changes and evolution of business data, or business entities, are considered as the main driver of the processes. The artifact-centric approach, a kind of data-centric business process modeling, focuses on describing how business data is changed/updated, by a particular action or task, throughout the process.

== Overview ==
In general, a process model describes activities conducted (i.e. activity-centric) in order to achieve business goals, informational structures, and organizational resources. Workflows, as a typical process modeling approach, often emphasize the sequencing of activities (i.e., control flows), but ignore the informational perspective or treat it only within the context of single activities. Without a complete view of the informational context, business actors often focus on what should be done instead of what can be done, hindering operational innovations.

Business process modeling is a foundation for design and management of business processes. Two key aspects of business process modeling are a formal framework that integrates both control flow and data, and a set of tools to assist all aspects of a business process life cycle. A typical business process life cycle includes at least a design phase, concerned with the “correct” realization of business logic in a resource-constrained environment, and an operational phase, concerned with optimizing and improving execution (operations). Traditional business process models emphasize a procedural and/or graph-based paradigm (i.e., control flow). Thus, methodologies to design workflow in those models are typically process-centric. It has been argued that a data-centric perspective is more useful for designing business processes in the modern era.

Intuitively, business artifacts (or simply artifacts) are data objects whose manipulations define the underlying processes in a business model. Recent engineering and development efforts have adopted the artifact approach for design and analysis of business models. An important distinction between artifact-centric models and traditional data flow (computational) models is that the notion of the life cycle of the data objects is prominent in the former, while not existing in the latter.

== Research and history ==
Artifact-centric modeling is an area of growing interest. Nigam and Caswell introduced the concept of business artifacts and information-centric processing of artifact lifecycles. Kumaran et al.'s further studies on artifact-centric business processes can be found here. Bhattacharya described a successful business engagement which applies business artifact techniques to industrialize discovery processes in pharmaceutical research. Liu et al. formulated nine commonly used patterns in information-centric business operation models and developed a computational model based on Petri Nets. Bhattacharya, K., et al. provides a formal model for artifact-centric business processes with complexity results concerning static analysis of the semantics of such processes. Kumaran et al. presented the formalized information-centric approach to discovering business entities from activity-centric process models and transforming such models into artifact-centric business process models. An algorithm was provided to achieve this transformation automatically.

Other approaches related to artifact-centric modelling can be found in,. Van der Aalst et al. provides a case-handling approach where a process is driven by the presence of data objects instead of control flows. A case is similar to the business entity concept in many respects. Wang and Kumar proposed the document-driven workflow systems which is designed based on data dependencies without the need for explicit control flows. Muller et al. also introduced the framework for the data-driven modelling of large process structures, namely COREPRO. The approach reduces modelling efforts significantly and provides mechanisms for maintaining data-driven process structures.

Another related thread of work is the use of state machines to model object lifecycles. Industries often define data objects and standardize their lifecycles as state machines to facilitate interoperability between industry partners and enforce legal regulations. Redding et al. and Küster et al. give techniques to generate business processes which are compliant with predefined object lifecycles. In addition, event-driven process modelling, for example, Event-driven Process Chains (EPC), also describes object lifecycles glued by events.

More recent and closely related work on artifact-centric process model can be found in. Gerede and Su developed a specification language ABSL to specify artifact behaviours in artifact-centric process models. The authors showed decidability results of their language for different cases and provided key insights on how artifact-centric view can affect the specification of desirable business properties. Gerede et al. identified important classes of properties on artifact-centric operational models focusing on persistence, uniqueness and arrival properties. They proposed a formal model for artifact-centric operational models to enable a static analysis of these properties and showed that the formal model guarantees persistence and uniqueness.

Fritz, Hull, and Su formulated the technical problem of goal-directed workflow construction in the context of declarative artifact-centric workflow, and develop results concerning the general setting, design time analysis, and the synthesis of workflow schemas from goal specifications. The work is among the important initial steps along the path towards eventual support for tools that enable substantial automation for workflow design, analysis, and modification. Deutsch et al. introduced the artifact system model, which formalizes a business process modelling paradigm that has recently attracted the attention of both the industrial and research communities. The problem of automatic verification of artifact systems, with the goal of increasing confidence in the correctness of such business processes is also studied.

Sira and Chengfei proposed a novel view framework for artifact-centric business processes. It consists of artifact-centric process model, process view model, a set of consistency rules, and the construction approach for building process views. The formal model of artifact-centric business processes and views, namely ACP, is defined and used to describe artifacts, services, business rules that control the processes, as well as views. They developed a bottom-up abstraction mechanism for process view construction to derive views from underlying process models according to view requirements. Consistency rules are also defined to preserve the consistency between constructed view and its underlying process. This work can be considered as one approach to the abstraction, i.e., generalization of artifact-centric business processes. The framework has also been extended to address modelling and change validation of inter-organizational business processes.

== See also ==
- Business architecture
- Business Model Canvas
- Business plan
- Business process illustration
- Business process mapping
- Business Process Modeling Notation
- Capability Maturity Model Integration
- Extended Enterprise Modeling Language
- Generalised Enterprise Reference Architecture and Methodology
- Model-driven engineering
