= BDN =

- Badalona, city in Catalonia, Spain (abbreviated form: BDN)
- Baldemu language, spoken in northern Cameroon (ISO 639-3 code: bdn)
- Bangor Daily News
- Bend Municipal Airport, Oregon, United States (IATA airport code: BDN)
- Benefit dependency network
- Black Disciples, a street gang in Chicago, United States
- Blue Dot Network
- Brading railway station, Isle of Wight, United Kingdom (National Rail code: BDN)
- BDN, sister station of BKN
