= Systems modeling =

Use of conceptual models

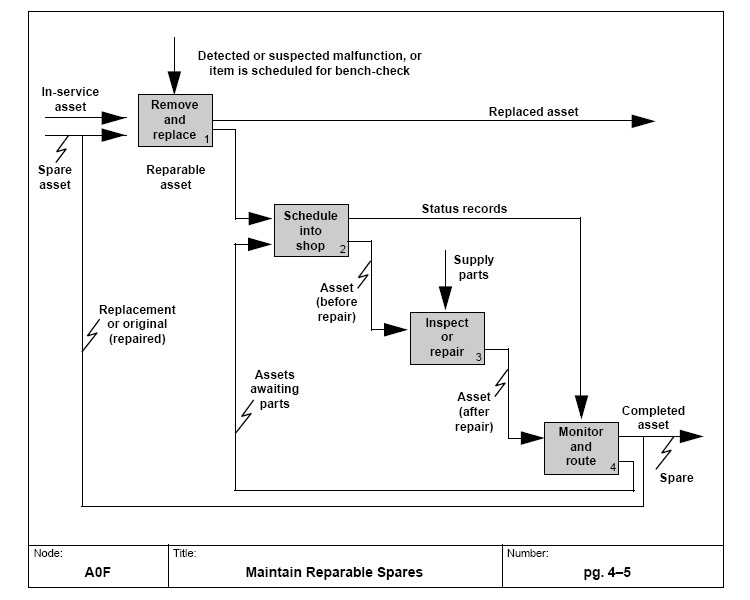
Example of an IDEF0 function model.

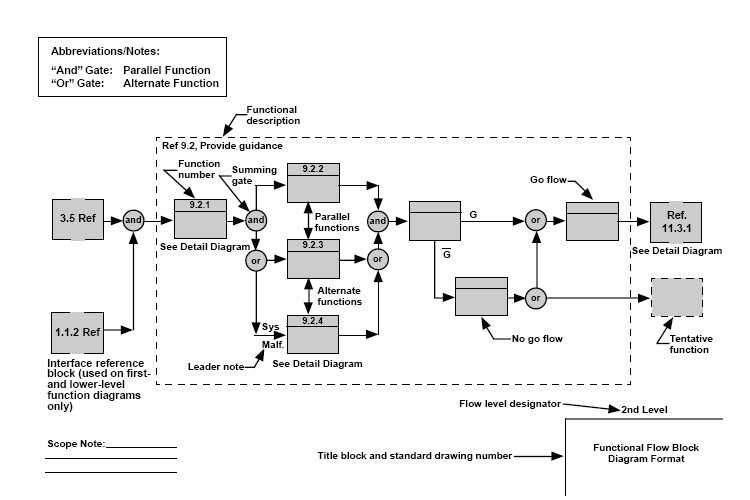
Functional Flow Block Diagram Format.

Decomposition structure.

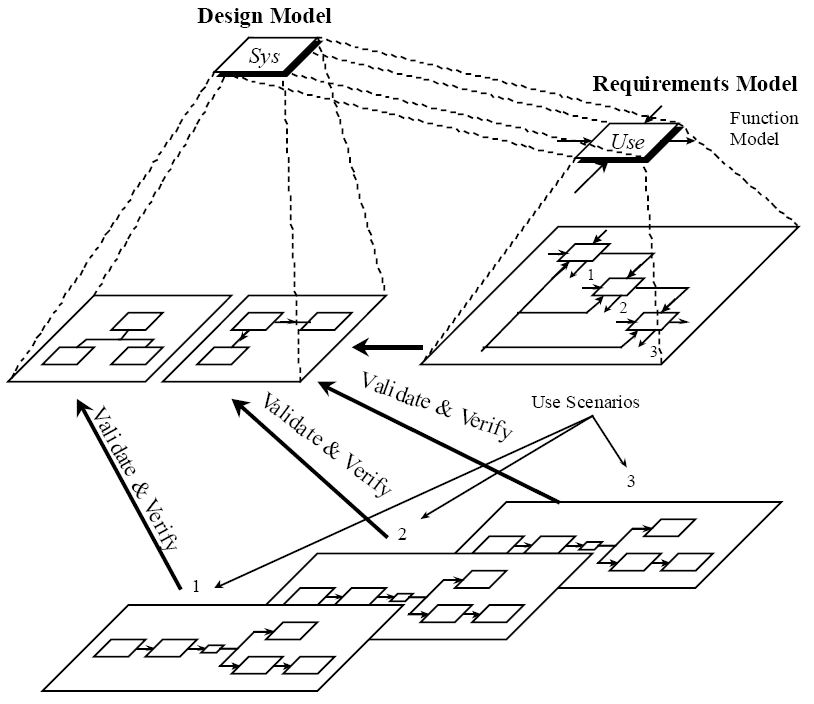
Static, dynamic, and requirements models for systems partition.

Business Process Modeling Notation Example.

Systems modeling or system modeling is the interdisciplinary study of the use of models to conceptualize and construct systems in business and IT development.

A common type of systems modeling is function modeling, with specific techniques such as the Functional Flow Block Diagram and IDEF0. These models can be extended using functional decomposition, and can be linked to requirements models for further systems partition.

Contrasting the functional modeling, another type of systems modeling is architectural modeling which uses the systems architecture to conceptually model the structure, behavior, and more views of a system.

The Business Process Modeling Notation (BPMN), a graphical representation for specifying business processes in a workflow, can also be considered to be a systems modeling language.

== Overview ==
In business and IT development the term "systems modeling" has multiple meanings. It can relate to:

- the use of model to conceptualize and construct systems
- the interdisciplinary study of the use of these models
- the systems modeling, analysis, and design efforts
- the systems modeling and simulation, such as system dynamics
- any specific systems modeling language

As a field of study systems modeling has emerged with the development of system theory and systems sciences.

As a type of modeling systems modeling is based on systems thinking and the systems approach. In business and IT systems modeling contrasts other approaches such as:

- agent based modeling
- data modeling and
- mathematical modeling

In "Methodology for Creating Business Knowledge" (1997) Arbnor and Bjerke the systems approach (systems modeling) was considered to be one of the three basic methodological approaches for gaining business knowledge, beside the analytical approach and the actor's approach (agent based modeling).

== History ==
The function model originates in the 1950s, after in the first half of the 20th century other types of management diagrams had already been developed. The first known Gantt chart was developed in 1896 by Karol Adamiecki, who called it a harmonogram. Because Adamiecki did not publish his chart until 1931 - and in any case his works were published in either Polish or Russian, languages not popular in the West - the chart now bears the name of Henry Gantt (1861–1919), who designed his chart around the years 1910-1915 and popularized it in the West. One of the first well defined function models, was the Functional Flow Block Diagram (FFBD) developed by the defense-related TRW Incorporated in the 1950s. In the 1960s it was exploited by the NASA to visualize the time sequence of events in a space systems and flight missions. It is further widely used in classical systems engineering to show the order of execution of system functions.

One of the earliest pioneering works in information systems modeling has been done by Young and Kent (1958), who argued:

Since we may be called upon to evaluate different computers or to find alternative ways of organizing current systems it is necessary to have some means of precisely stating a data processing problem independently of mechanization.

They aimed for a precise and abstract way of specifying the informational and time characteristics of a data processing problem, and wanted to create a notation that should enable the analyst to organize the problem around any piece of hardware. Their efforts was not so much focused on independent systems analysis, but on creating abstract specification and invariant basis for designing different alternative implementations using different hardware components.

A next step in IS modeling was taken by CODASYL, an IT industry consortium formed in 1959, who essentially aimed at the same thing as Young and Kent: the development of "a proper structure for machine independent problem definition language, at the system level of data processing". This led to the development of a specific IS information algebra.

== Types of systems modeling ==
In business and IT development systems are modeled with different scopes and scales of complexity, such as:

- Functional modeling
- Systems architecture
- Business process modeling
- Enterprise modeling

Further more like systems thinking, systems modeling in can be divided into:

- Systems analysis
- Hard systems modeling or operational research modeling
- Soft system modeling
- Process based system modeling

And all other specific types of systems modeling, such as form example complex systems modeling, dynamical systems modeling, and critical systems modeling.

== Specific types of modeling languages ==
- Framework-specific modeling language
- Systems Modeling Language

== See also ==
- Behavioral modeling
- Dynamic systems
- Human visual system model – a human visual system model used by image processing, video processing, and computer vision
- Open energy system models – energy system models adopting open science principles
- SEQUAL framework
- Software and Systems Modeling
- Solar System model – a model that illustrates the relative positions and motions of the planets and stars
- Statistical model
- Systems analysis
- Systems design
- Systems biology modeling
- Viable system model – a model of the organizational structure of any viable or autonomous system
