= Whitewater Interactive System Development with Object Models =

Wisdom (Whitewater Interactive System Development with Object Models) is a software development process and method to design software-intensive interactive systems. It is based on object modelling, and focuses human-computer interaction (HCI) in order to model the software architecture of the system i.e. it is architecture-centric. The focus on HCI while being architecture-centric places Wisdom as a pioneer method within human-centered software engineering. Wisdom was conceived by Nuno Nunes and first published in the years 1999-2000 in order to close the gaps of existing software engineering methods regarding the user interface design.

Notably, the Wisdom method identifies for each use case the tasks of the user, the interaction spaces of the user interface, and the system responsibilities that support that user activity, which are complemented with the data entities used in each case, completing a usable software architecture, an MVC model. The Wisdom model clarifies the relation between the human and the computer-based system, allows rationalization over the software artifacts that must be implemented, therefore facilitating effort affection for a software development team.

From Wisdom, other relevant contributions were derived targeting the enhancement of software development based on the Wisdom model, such as: CanonSketch, Hydra Framework Cruz's

Another relevant contribution is related to effort estimation of software development, the iUCP method, which is based in traditional UCP method leveling the estimation based on the predicted user interface design. A comparison study was carried out using both methods, revealing that there is positive effect in the usage of iUCP when compared to UCP when considering the user interface design, a recurrent situation in nowadays software systems development.
