= Actor (UML) =

Role in the Unified Modeling Language

UML use case diagram with two actors (Parent-Teacher and Child) and 5 use cases.

An actor in the Unified Modeling Language (UML) "specifies a role played by a user or any other system that interacts with the subject."

"An Actor models a type of role played by an entity that interacts with the subject (e.g., by exchanging signals and data), but which is external to the subject."

"Actors may represent roles played by human users, external hardware, or other subjects. Actors do not necessarily represent specific physical entities but merely particular facets (i.e., “roles”) of some entities that are relevant to the specification of its associated use cases. A single physical instance may play the role of several different actors and a given actor may be played by multiple different instances."

UML 2 does not permit associations between Actors. The use of generalization/specialization relationship between actors is useful in modeling overlapping behaviours between actors and does not violate this constraint since a generalization relation is not a type of association.

Actors interact with use cases.
