= Business Motivation Model =

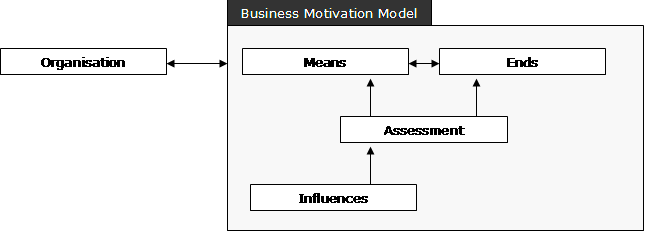
Business Motivation Model

The Business Motivation Model (BMM) in enterprise architecture provides a scheme and structure for developing, communicating, and managing business plans in an organized manner. Specifically, the Business Motivation Model does all the following:

- identifies factors that motivate the establishing of business plans;
- identifies and defines the elements of business plans; and
- indicates how all these factors and elements inter-relate.

== History ==
Initially developed by the Business Rules Group (BRG), in September 2005, the Object Management Group (OMG) voted to accept the Business Motivation Model as the subject of a Request for Comment (RFC). This meant that the OMG was willing to consider the Business Motivation Model as a specification to be adopted by the OMG, subject to comment from any interested parties. Adoption as an OMG specification carries the intention that the Business Motivation Model would, in time, be submitted to the International Organization for Standardization (ISO) as a standard.

In August 2008 version 1.0 was released by OMG.

In May 2015, version 1.3 of BMM specification was released and as of May 2015 it is the latest stable release.

== Elements ==
"BMM captures business requirements across different dimensions to rigorously capture and justify why the business wants to do something, what it is aiming to achieve, how it plans to get there, and how it assesses the result."

The main elements of BMM are:

- Ends: What (as opposed to how) the business wants to accomplish
- Means: How the business intends to accomplish its ends
- Directives: The rules and policies that constrain or govern the available means
- Influencers: Can cause changes that affect the organization in its employment of its means or achievement of its ends. Influencers are neutral by definition.
- Assessment: A judgment of an Influencer that influences the organization's ability to achieve its ends or use its means.

== standards ==
- Semantics of Business Vocabulary and Business Rules (SBVR)

Other related frameworks are:

- POLDAT
- Zachman Framework
- Business framework

== See also ==
- Business model
- i*
- Motivation
- Strategy Markup Language
