= Axel van Lamsweerde =

Belgian computer scientist

Axel van Lamsweerde (born 1947) is a Belgian computer scientist and Professor of Computing Science at the Universite catholique de Louvain, known for his work on requirements engineering and the development of the KAOS goal-oriented modeling language.

== Biography ==
Van Lamsweerde received his MS in Mathematics from the Université catholique de Louvain and his PhD in computing science from the Université libre de Bruxelles.

Van Lamsweerde started his career as research associate at Philips Research Labs in 1970. In 1980 he was appointed Professor at the Université de Namur, and later also professor at the Université libre de Bruxelles, and research fellow at the University of Oregon and Stanford. From 1988 to 1990 he directed the ESPRIT ICARUS project. Late 1990s he was appointed Professor of Computing Science at the Universite catholique de Louvain, where he also directed the Software Engineering group in the "Departement d'Ingenierie Informatique".

Van Lamsweerde chaired several international software engineering conferences, such as ESEC'91 and ICSE'94, was Editor-in-Chief of the ACM Transactions in Software Engineering and Methodology, and founding member of the IFIP WG2.9 Working Group on Requirements Engineering. In 2000 Van Lamsweerde was elected ACM Fellow, in 2000 he was awarded the ACM SIGSOFT Distinguished Service Award, and in 2008 the ACM SIGSOFT Outstanding Research Award.

== Work ==
The research interests of Van Lamsweerde are in the fields of "precise techniques for requirements engineering, system modeling, high assurance systems, lightweight formal methods, process modeling and analysis, medical safety, and knowledge-based software development environments." Since the 1990s he has been developing modeling language for goal modeling, named the KAOS goal-oriented modeling language.

== Selected publications ==
Books:

- Axel Lamsweerde, Pierre Dufour. Current issues in expert systems. 1987.
- Axel van Lamsweerde, Alfonso Fuggetta (eds.) ESEC '91: 3rd European Software Engineering Conference, ESEC '91, Milan, Italy, October 21–24, 1991. Proceedings. Springer Science & Business Media, 9 okt. 1991.
- Axel van Lamsweerde. Requirements Engineering: From System Goals to UML Models to Software Specifications. Wiley, 9 feb. 2009

Articles a selection:

- Dardenne, Anne, Axel Van Lamsweerde, and Stephen Fickas. "Goal-directed requirements acquisition." Science of computer programming 20.1 (1993): 3-50.
- Van Lamsweerde, Axel. "Requirements engineering in the year 00: A research perspective." Proceedings of the 22nd international conference on Software engineering. ACM, 2000.
- Van Lamsweerde, Axel. "http://courses.cs.ut.ee/2010/sem/uploads/Main/04RE-reading-goals.pdf Goal-oriented requirements engineering: A guided tour." Requirements Engineering, 2001. Proceedings. Fifth IEEE International Symposium on. IEEE, 2001.
