= Andreas Lothe Opdahl =

Norwegian computer scientist

Andreas Lothe Opdahl (born 1964) is a Norwegian computer scientist and Professor of Information Systems Development at the University of Bergen, known for his theory about Security requirements engineering, and for with Guttorm Sindre coining the term Misuse case.

== Life and work ==
Born in 1964, Opdahl received his M.Sc. in Computer science in 1988 from the Norwegian Institute of Technology (NTNU), where in 1992 he also received his PhD in computer science with the thesis, entitled "Performance engineering during information system development."

In 1985 Opdahl had started working as systems developer. He was lecturer at the Norwegian Institute of Technology from 1988 to 1992. In 1992 he was appointed Professor of Information Systems Development at the University of Bergen in the Department of Information Science and Media Studies. There he also directs the research group for Semantic and Social Information Systems (SSIS).

== Selected publications ==
Books:

- Lindland, Odd Ivar, and Andreas Lothe Opdahl. Representation of Diagrammatic Systems Specifications in Temporal Logic. University of Trondheim, 1987.
- Opdahl, Andreas Lothe. Performance engineering during information system development. Institutt for Datateknikk of Telematikk, 1992.
- John Krogstie, Andreas Lothe Opdahl and Sjaak Brinkkemper eds. Conceptual modelling in information systems engineering. Heidelberg: Springer, 2007.

Articles, a selection:

- Sindre, Guttorm, and Andreas L. Opdahl. "Templates for misuse case description." Proceedings of the 7th International Workshop on Requirements Engineering, Foundation for Software Quality (REFSQ'2001), Switzerland. 2001.
- Opdahl, Andreas L., and Brian Henderson-Sellers. "Ontological evaluation of the UML using the Bunge–Wand–Weber model." Software and systems modeling 1.1 (2002): 43-67.
- Krogstie, J., Lyytinen, K., Opdahl, A. L., Pernici, B., Siau, K., & Smolander, K. (2004). "Research areas and challenges for mobile information systems." International Journal of Mobile Communications, 2(3), 220-234.
- Sindre, Guttorm, and Andreas L. Opdahl. "Eliciting security requirements with misuse cases." Requirements engineering 10.1 (2005): 34-44.
