= John Krogstie =

Norwegian computer scientist

John Krogstie (born 23 May 1967) is a Norwegian computer scientist, professor in information systems at the Norwegian University of Science and Technology (NTNU) in Trondheim, Norway, and an expert in the field of enterprise modelling.

== Biography ==
John Krogstie received a MSc in 1991 and a PhD in 1995 both in information systems from the Norwegian University of Science and Technology. From 1991 to 2000 he was employed as a manager in Accenture. In 2000-2005 he was a senior researcher in SINTEF. He is a professor in information systems at NTNU in Trondheim, Norway.

John Krogstie is the Norwegian representative for IFIP TC8 and was Chair (2010–2015) of IFIP WG 8.1 on information systems design and evaluation.

== Work ==
Krogstie's research interests include information systems, conceptual modeling, mobile information systems, eGovernment and enterprise modelling.

=== The SEQUAL framework ===
The SEQUAL framework is a reference model for evaluating the quality of models, the semiotic quality framework (SEQUAL) developed by John Krogstie. The SEQUAL framework is grounded in semiotics, particularly the semiotic theory of Charles W. Morris. It builds on semiotic theory and defines several quality aspects based on relationships between a model, a body of knowledge, a domain, a modeling language, and the activities of learning, taking action, and modeling. Its usefulness was confirmed in a 2002 experiment.

The basic idea behind the SEQUAL framework is, that conceptual models can be considered as sets of statements in a language, and therefore can be evaluated in semiotic/linguistic terms. A first semiotic framework for evaluating conceptual models was originally proposed by Lindland et al. in the 1994 article "Understanding quality in conceptual modeling". In its initial version, it considered three quality levels:

- syntactic,
- semantic, and
- pragmatic quality

The framework was later extended, and called the SEQUAL framework by Krogstie et al. in the 1995 article "Defining quality aspects for conceptual models". In the 2002 article "Quality of interactive models" Krogstie & Jørgensen extended the initial framework adding more levels of Stamper's semiotic ladder.

=== Perspectives to Process Modeling, 2013 ===
In the 2013 article Perspectives to Process Modeling a review is presented of business process modeling; first describing the main approaches of process modeling which are then classified according to the main modeling perspective being used with modeling perspectives namely the: behavioral, functional, structural, goal-oriented, object-oriented, language action, organizational and geographical.

== See also ==
- Extended Enterprise Modeling Language
- The quality of modelling languages
- View model

== Publications ==
Krogstie has published around 150 refereed papers in journals, books, and archival proceedings since 1991. Books, a selection:

- 2005. Information modeling methods and methodologies. With Terry Halpin and Keng Siau (editors).
- 2007. Conceptual Modelling in Information Systems Engineering. With Andreas Lothe Opdahl and Sjaak Brinkkemper.
- 2008. Active Knowledge Modeling of Enterprises. With Frank Lillehagen. Springer, 2008. ISBN 3-540-79415-8
