= Björn Bjerke =

Swedish economist

Björn Bjerke (1941–2018) was a Swedish economist, professor in entrepreneurship and small firms at Stockholm University, known for the 1997 book "Methodology for Creating Business Knowledge" written with Ingeman Arbnor.

Bjerke received his PhD from the Lund University, where he kept working for some years. Later he held professorships at the Waikato University in New Zealand, the King Fahd University of Petroleum and Minerals in Saudi Arabia, University of Maiduguri in Nigeria and the University of Southern California. He was also Senior Fellow at the National University of Singapore in Singapore. Back in Sweden in the new millennium Bjerke was working at the Malmö University College before going to Stockholm. At Stockholm University Bjerke led a research group in entrepreneurship consisting of 15 junior researchers. From 2007 to 2011 he has been working at the Baltic Business School at the Linnaeus University in Kalmar, Sweden. Bjarke, coined the term "public entrepreneurship" attempting to describe the non-profit orientated standard, associated with subjects of the higher-stage-socialist welfare, operating with relative autonomy under a dominating state enterprise.

Bjerke's research interests "centre around methodologies in order to study entrepreneurship, the role of marketing in successful entrepreneurships and successful regions of growth and entrepreneurship’s role in this connection".

== Publications ==
Books, a selection:

- 1974. Problemformulering och systemanalys: Introduktion till utredningsmetodik med exempel
- 1975. Produktionsekonomi with Rolf Andersson and Bengt O. Färnström.
- 1981. Some comments on methodology in management research
- 1994. Företagsekonomisk metodlära with Ingeman Arbnor
- 1997. Methodology for Creating Business Knowledge. With Ingeman Arbnor. California : Sage Publications. (Third Edition 2009).
- 1999. Facing Business. Krieger Publishing Company.
- 2000. Business Leadership and Culture. National Management Styles in the Global economy. Edward Elgar. UK/US.
- 2002. Entrepreneurial marketing : the growth of small firms in the new economic era. Cheltenham: Edward Elgar.
- 2007. Understanding Entrepreneurship
- 2011. Entrepreneurial Imagination : Time, Timing, Space and Place in Business Action with Hans Rämö. Edward Elgar. UK/US.
- 2013. Social Entrepreneurship: To act as if and make a difference. With Mathias Karlsson. Edward Elgar. UK/US.
