= POLDAT =

POLDAT is an acronym for Process, Organization and Location (Business Architecture) and Data, Applications and Technology (Systems Architecture). They are the Domains of Change in DXC Technology's Catalyst Methodology. POLDAT is not a framework, but it is the core of Catalyst, which is a detailed "Business Change through Information Technology" methodology. In more recent times, POLDAT has been complemented with the "CC" prefix making it CCPOLDAT. The "CC" prefix is an acronym for Customer and Channel. The complete version being CCPOLDAT an acronym for Customer, Channel, Process, Organisation, Location, Data, Application and Technology. Catalyst is an extensive program, project and operations management methodology with a range of development paths including an Agile like approach.

Some organisations have further enhanced CCPOLDAT to also include :Corporation, Management, Integration, Suppliers, Competitors, Government and Other 3rd parties.

Enhanced Domains of Change (CMPOLTAIDCCSCGO):

1. Corporate - the ultimate kernel of the enterprise.
2. Management
3. Process
4. Organisation
5. Location
6. Technology
7. Application
8. Integration
9. Data (ETL)
10. Channel
11. Customer
12. Supplier
13. Competitor
14. Government
15. Other 3rd parties

POLDAT is an architectural unification approach to recognize the commonalities between the radical re-engineering, Enterprise Transformation Planning and IS Planning. It dates to Catalyst Release 3 in the early 1990s and was one of the earliest integrated Enterprise methodologies.

It is also embedded in Casewise's Corporate Modeler, an early partner in providing automated support to Catalyst in the mid 1990s.

This and some other factors has contributed to the POLDAT framework being slightly more prevalent in Europe.
