= Bend Municipal Airport =

Airport in Bend, Oregon

- IATA: none; ICAO: KBDN; FAA LID: BDN

Summary
- Airport type: Public
- Owner: City of Bend
- Serves: Bend, Oregon
- Elevation AMSL: 3,459 ft (1,054 m)
- Coordinates: 44°05′40″N 121°12′00″W
- Website: Official website
- Interactive map of Bend Municipal Airport

Runways
Direction	Length		Surface
Direction	ft	m	Surface
16/34	5,201	1,585	Asphalt

Statistics (2020)
- Aircraft operations (year ending 6/15/2020): 141,175
- Based aircraft: 243
- Source: Federal Aviation Administration

Bend Municipal Airport (ICAO: KBDN, FAA LID: BDN) is six miles (9.7 km) northeast of Bend, in Deschutes County, Oregon. The FAA's National Plan of Integrated Airport Systems for 2009–2013 categorizes it as a general aviation facility. Bend is home to Epic Aircraft and X-Air.

Scheduled passenger airline flights use Roberts Field (RDM) in Redmond, Oregon, about 20 miles (32 km) north of Bend.

Most U.S. airports use the same three-letter location identifier for the FAA and IATA, but this airport is BDN to the FAA and has no IATA code (IATA assigned BDN to Talhar Airport in Badin, Pakistan).

== History ==
Covering about 415 acres (168 ha), Bend Municipal Airport traces its history to 1942. A group of Bend citizens banded together to deed a small piece of farmland to the City of Bend for a municipal landing strip. The site was developed and used for pilot training through World War II. After the war, the airstrip was maintained by the City of Bend for civil use; it slowly grew during the 1950s and 1960s.

In 1979, development of an Airport Master Plan was undertaken. This plan established the direction for development at the airport and forecast significant growth in activity at the Bend Airport. This plan, however, was completed while general aviation was booming across the country. A downturn in the general economy affected general aviation in the 1980s and through the early 1990s, and the forecast growth did not materialize.

That changed by the late 1990s, and general aviation began a resurgence that continues today, along with increased business and corporate aviation travel to Bend. Continued development of Epic Aircraft, Leading Edge Aviation, Precise Flight, and other tenants on the airport have made an aviation business park of the Bend Airport. More than eighteen aviation-related businesses on the airport employ more than 1000 people, making the Bend Municipal Airport one of the largest concentrations of family-wage jobs in the Bend area.

By 1998, a factory for Lancair was under construction at the airport.

Over the next several years, a number of improvements are planned, including an Airport Master Plan Update and development of a full east side parallel taxiway, as well as more than 40 acres (16 ha) of general aviation and corporate aviation facilities.

== Facilities ==
Bend Municipal Airport covers 415 acres (168 ha) at an elevation of 3,459 feet (1,054 m). Its one runway, 16/34, is 5,201 by 75 feet (1,585 m × 23 m) asphalt and has two parallel taxiways.

Bend Municipal Airport is identified as a Category 2, High Activity Business and General Aviation airport by the Oregon Department of Aviation. In the year ending June 15, 2020, the airport had 141,175 aircraft operations, average 387 per day: 99% general aviation, <1% air taxi, and <1% military. 243 aircraft were then based at this airport: 185 single-engine, 17 multi-engine, 9 jet, 23 helicopter, and 9 glider.

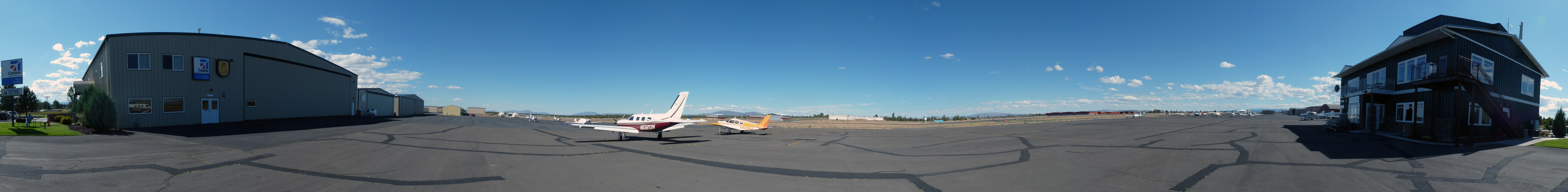
Bend, Oregon airport
