= Use case =

Potential scenario for use of a system

A very simple use case diagram of a Wiki system. Registered user of Wiki edits an article.

In both software and systems engineering, a use case is a structured description of a system’s behavior as it responds to requests from external actors, aiming to achieve a specific goal. The term is also used outside software/systems engineering to describe how something can be used.

In software (and software-based systems) engineering, it is used to define and validate functional requirements. A use case is a list of actions or event steps typically defining the interactions between a role (known in the Unified Modeling Language (UML) as an actor) and a system to achieve a goal. The actor can be a human or another external system. In systems engineering, use cases are used at a higher level than within software engineering, often representing missions or stakeholder goals. The detailed requirements may then be captured in the Systems Modeling Language (SysML) or as contractual statements.

== Differences between systems and software engineering use cases ==
In software engineering, the use case defines potential scenarios of the software in response to an external request (such as user input). In systems engineering, a use case models high-level functional behavior across technical and human components.

== Definition ==
In software and systems engineering, the phrase use case is a polyseme with two senses:

1. A usage scenario for a piece of software; often used in the plural to suggest situations where a piece of software may be useful.
2. A potential scenario in which a system receives an external request (such as user input) and responds to it.

This article discusses the latter sense.

== History ==
In 1987, Ivar Jacobson presented the first article on use cases at the OOPSLA'87 conference. He described how this technique was used at Ericsson to capture and specify requirements of a system using textual, structural, and visual modeling techniques to drive object-oriented analysis and design. Originally he had used the terms usage scenarios and usage case – the latter a direct translation of his Swedish term användningsfall – but found that neither of these terms sounded natural in English, and eventually he settled on use case.

In 1992 he co-authored the book Object-Oriented Software Engineering – A Use Case Driven Approach, which laid the foundation of the OOSE system engineering method and helped to popularize use cases for capturing functional requirements, especially in software development. In 1994 he published a book about use cases and object-oriented techniques applied to business models and business process reengineering.

At the same time, Grady Booch and James Rumbaugh worked at unifying their object-oriented analysis and design methods, the Booch method and Object Modeling Technique (OMT) respectively. In 1995 Ivar Jacobson joined them and together they created the Unified Modelling Language (UML), which includes use case modeling. UML was standardized by the Object Management Group (OMG) in 1997. Jacobson, Booch and Rumbaugh also worked on a refinement of the Objectory software development process. The resulting Unified Process was published in 1999 and promoted a use case driven approach.

Since then, many authors have contributed to the development of the technique, notably: Larry Constantine developed in 1995, in the context of usage-centered design, so called "essential use-cases" that aim to describe user intents rather than sequences of actions or scenarios which might constrain or bias the design of user interface; Alistair Cockburn published in 2000 a goal-oriented use case practice based on text narratives and tabular specifications; Kurt Bittner and Ian Spence developed in 2002 advanced practices for analyzing functional requirements with use cases; Dean Leffingwell and Don Widrig proposed to apply use cases to change management and stakeholder communication activities; Gunnar Overgaard proposed in 2004 to extend the principles of design patterns to use cases.

In 2011, Jacobson published with Ian Spence and Kurt Bittner the ebook Use Case 2.0 to adapt the technique to an agile context, enriching it with incremental use case "slices", and promoting its use across the full development lifecycle after having presented the renewed approach at the annual IIBA conference.

== General principle ==
Use cases are a technique for capturing, modeling, and specifying the requirements of a system. A use case corresponds to a set of behaviors that the system may perform in interaction with its actors, and which produces an observable result that contributes to its goals. Actors represent the role that human users or other systems have in the interaction.

In the requirement analysis, at their identification, a use case is named according to the specific user goal that it represents for its primary actor. The case is further detailed with a textual description or with additional graphical models that explain the general sequence of activities and events, as well as variants such as special conditions, exceptions, or error situations.

According to the Software Engineering Body of Knowledge (SWEBOK), use cases belong to the scenario-based requirement elicitation techniques, as well as the model-based analysis, techniques. But the use cases also support narrative-based requirement gathering, incremental requirement acquisition, system documentation, and acceptance testing.

=== Variations ===
There are different kinds of use cases and variations in the technique:

- System use cases specify the requirements of a system to be developed. They identify in their detailed description not only the interactions with the actors but also the entities that are involved in the processing. They are the starting point for further analysis models and design activities.
- Business use cases focus on a business organization instead of a software system. They are used to specify business models and business process requirements in the context of business process reengineering initiatives.
- Essential use cases, also called abstract use cases, describe the potential intents of the actors and how the system addresses these, without defining any sequence or describing a scenario. This practice was developed with the aim of supporting the user-centric design and avoiding to induce bias about the user interface in the early stage of the system specifications.
- Use Case 2.0 to adapt the technique for the context of agile development methods. This technique enriches the requirement-gathering practice with support for user-story narratives. It also provides use case "slices" to facilitate incremental elicitation of requirements and enable incremental implementation.

=== Scope ===
The scope of a use case can be defined by a subject and by goals:

- The subject identifies the system, sub-system, or component that will provide the interactions.
- The goals can be structured hierarchically, taking into account the organizational level interested in the goal (e.g. company, department, user), and the decomposition of the user's goal into sub-goals. The decomposition of the goal is performed from the point of view of the users, and independently of the system, which differs from traditional functional decomposition.

=== Usage ===
Use cases are known to be applied in the following contexts:

- Object Oriented Software Engineering (OOSE), as driving element;
- Unified Modeling Language (UML), as a behavioral modelling instrument;
- Unified Software Development Process (UP) and its fore-runner, the IBM Rational Unified Process (RUP);
- up-front documentation of software requirements specification (SRS), as an alternative structure for the functional requirements;
- deriving the design from the requirements using the entity–control–boundary approach;
- and agile development.

== Templates ==
There are many ways to write a use case in the text, from use case brief, casual, outline, to fully dressed etc., and with varied templates. Writing use cases in templates devised by various vendors or experts is a common industry practice to get high-quality functional system requirements.

=== Cockburn style ===
The template defined by Alistair Cockburn in his book Writing Effective Use Cases has been one of the most widely used writing styles of use cases.

==== Design scopes ====
Cockburn suggests annotating each use case with a symbol to show the "Design Scope", which may be black-box (internal detail is hidden) or white box (internal detail is shown). Five symbols are available:

Scope	Icon	Symbol
Organization (black-box)	Filled House	Scope-icons-filled-house
Organization (white-box)	Unfilled House	Scope-icons-unfilled-house
System (black-box)	Filled Box	Scope-icons-filled-box
System (white-box)	Unfilled Box	Scope-icons-unfilled-box
Component	Screw or Bolt	Scope-icons-screw-bolt

Other authors sometimes call use cases at the Organization level "Business use cases".

==== Goal levels ====
Hierarchy of goal levels

Cockburn suggests annotating each use case with a symbol to show the "Goal Level"; the preferred level is "User-goal" (or colloquially "sea level").

Goal Level	Icon	Text Symbol	Symbol
Very High Summary	Cloud	++	
Summary	Flying Kite	+	
User Goal	Waves at Sea	!	
Subfunction	Fish	-	
Too Low	Seabed Clam-Shell	--	

Sometimes in text writing, a use case name followed by an alternative text symbol (! +, -, etc.) is a more concise and convenient way to denote levels, e.g. place an order!, login-.

==== Fully dressed ====
Cockburn describes a more detailed structure for a use case but permits it to be simplified when less detail is needed. His fully dressed use case template lists the following fields:

- Title: "an active-verb goal phrase that names the goal of the primary actor"
- Primary Actor
- Goal in Context
- Scope
- Level
- Stakeholders and Interests
- Precondition
- Minimal Guarantees
- Success Guarantees
- Trigger
- Main Success Scenario
- Extensions
- Technology & Data Variations List

In addition, Cockburn suggests using two devices to indicate the nature of each use case: icons for design scope and goal level.

Cockburn's approach has influenced other authors; for example, Alexander and Beus-Dukic generalize Cockburn's "Fully dressed use case" template from software to systems of all kinds, with the following fields differing from Cockburn:

- Variation scenarios "(maybe branching off from and maybe returning to the main scenario)"
- Exceptions "i.e. exception events and their exception-handling scenarios"

==== Casual ====
Cockburn recognizes that projects may not always need detailed "fully dressed" use cases. He describes a Casual use case with the fields:

- Title (goal)
- Primary Actor
- Scope
- Level
- (Story): the body of the use case is simply a paragraph or two of text, informally describing what happens.

=== Fowler style ===
Martin Fowler states "There is no standard way to write the content of a use case, and different formats work well in different cases." He describes "a common style to use" as follows:

- Title: "goal the use case is trying to satisfy"
- Main Success Scenario: numbered list of steps
  - Step: "a simple statement of the interaction between the actor and a system"
- Extensions: separately numbered lists, one per Extension
  - Extension: "a condition that results in different interactions from .. the main success scenario". An extension from main step 3 is numbered 3a, etc.

The Fowler style can also be viewed as a simplified variant of the Cockburn template. This variant is called a user story.

Alistair Cockburn stated:

Think of a User Story as a Use Case at 2 bits of precision. Bit 1 of precision names the goal of the use case, and Bit 2 adds the main scenario. Bit 3 adds the failure conditions, Bit 4 adds the failure actions. Bit 5 adds a data description of the in/out data. I would put Catalysis at the 6th bit of precision, as they include a model also of the recipient of the message. In the CrystalMethodology family, differently founded projects use cases at different levels of precision. A methodologically light project uses User Stories, a methodologically heavier project uses Use Cases to 4 bits of precision, and Catalysis uses 6 bits of precision.

Martin Fowler stated:

It is all about how people use cases. I've seen many people use cases in a very formalized manner. Kent does his UserStories in a much more approachable manner. I do use cases the way Kent does User Stories. I call them to use cases to better communicate with other developers and to influence them to use a more lightweight approach.

== Actors ==
A use case defines the interactions between external actors and the system under consideration to accomplish a goal. Actors must be able to make decisions, but need not be human: "An actor might be a person, a company or organization, a computer program, or a computer system—hardware, software, or both." Actors are always stakeholders, but not all stakeholders are actors, since they may "never interact directly with the system, even though they have the right to care how the system behaves." For example, "the owners of the system, the company's board of directors, and regulatory bodies such as the Internal Revenue Service and the Department of Insurance" could all be stakeholders but are unlikely to be actors.

Similarly, a person using a system may be represented as a different actor because of playing different roles. For example, user "Joe" could be playing the role of a Customer when using an Automated Teller Machine to withdraw cash from his own account or playing the role of a Bank Teller when using the system to restock the cash drawer on behalf of the bank.

Actors are often working on behalf of someone else. Cockburn writes that "These days I write 'sales rep for the customer' or 'clerk for the marketing department' to capture that the user of the system is acting for someone else." This tells the project that the "user interface and security clearances" should be designed for the sales rep and clerk, but that the customer and marketing department are the roles concerned about the results.

A stakeholder may play both an active and an inactive role: for example, a Consumer is both a "mass-market purchaser" (not interacting with the system) and a User (an actor, actively interacting with the purchased product). In turn, a User is both a "normal operator" (an actor using the system for its intended purpose) and a "functional beneficiary" (a stakeholder who benefits from the use of the system). For example, when user "Joe" withdraws cash from his account, he is operating the Automated Teller Machine and obtaining a result on his own behalf.

Cockburn advises looking for actors among the stakeholders of a system, the primary and supporting (secondary) actors of a use case, the system under design (SuD) itself, and finally among the "internal actors", namely the components of the system under design.

== Business use case ==
In the same way that a use case describes a series of events and interactions between a user (or other types of Actor) and a system, in order to produce a result of value (goal), a business use case describes the more general interaction between a business system and the users/actors of that system to produce business results of value. The primary difference is that the system considered in a business use case model may contain people in addition to technological systems. These "people in the system" are called business workers. In the example of a restaurant, a decision must be made whether to treat each person as an actor (thus outside the system) or a business worker (inside the system). If a waiter is considered an actor, as shown in the example below, then the restaurant system does not include the waiter, and the model exposes the interaction between the waiter and the restaurant. An alternative would be to consider the waiter as a part of the restaurant system (a business worker) while considering the client to be outside the system (an actor).

A business Use case diagram depicts a model of several business use cases (goals) which represents the interactions between a restaurant (the business system) and its primary stakeholders (business actors and business workers).

== Visual modeling ==
Use cases are not only texts but also diagrams if needed. In the Unified Modeling Language, the relationships between use cases and actors are represented in use case diagrams originally based upon Ivar Jacobson's Objectory notation. SysML uses the same notation at a system block level.

In addition, other behavioral UML diagrams such as activity diagrams, sequence diagrams, communication diagrams, and state machine diagrams can also be used to visualize use cases accordingly. Specifically, a System Sequence Diagram (SSD) is a sequence diagram often used to show the interactions between the external actors and the system under design (SuD), usually for visualizing a particular scenario of a use case.

Use case analysis usually starts by drawing use case diagrams. For agile development, a requirement model of many UML diagrams depicting use cases plus some textual descriptions, notes, or use case briefs would be very lightweight and just enough for small or easy project use. As good complements to use case texts, the visual diagram representations of use cases are also effective facilitating tools for the better understanding, communication, and design of complex system behavioral requirements.

== Examples ==
Below is a sample use case written with a slightly modified version of the Cockburn-style template. Note that there are no buttons, controls, forms, or any other UI elements and operations in the basic use case description, where only user goals, subgoals, or intentions are expressed in every step of the basic flow or extensions. This practice makes the requirement specification clearer and maximizes the flexibility of the design and implementation.

Use Case: Edit an article

Primary Actor: Member (Registered User)

Scope: a Wiki system

Level: ! (User goal or sea level)

Brief: (equivalent to a user story or an epic)

The member edits any part (the entire article or just a section) of an article they are reading. Preview and changes comparison are allowed during the editing.

Stakeholders

...

Postconditions

Minimal Guarantees:
Success Guarantees:
- The article is saved and an updated view is shown.
- An edit record for the article is created by the system, so watchers of the article can be informed of the update later.

Preconditions:

The article with editing enabled is presented to the member.

Triggers:

The member invokes an edit request (for the full article or just one section) on the article.

Basic flow:

1. The system provides a new editor area/box filled with all the article's relevant content with an informative edit summary for the member to edit. If the member just wants to edit a section of the report, only the original content of the section is shown, with the section title automatically filled out in the edit summary.
2. The member modifies the article's content until the member is satisfied.
3. The member fills out the edit summary, tells the system if they want to watch this article, and submits the edit.
4. The system saves the article, logs the edit event, and finishes any necessary post-processing.
5. The system presents the updated view of the article to the member.

Extensions:

2–3.

a. Show preview:
1. The member selects Show preview which submits the modified content.
2. The system reruns step 1 with the addition of the rendered updated content for preview, and informs the member that his/her edits have not been saved yet, then continues.
b. Show changes:
1. The member selects Show changes which submits the modified content.
2. The system reruns step 1 with the addition of showing the results of comparing the differences between the current edits by the member and the most recent saved version of the article, then continues.
c. Cancel the edit:
1. The member selects Cancel.
2. The system discards any change the member has made, then goes to step 5.

4a. Timeout:

...

== Advantages ==
Since the inception of the agile movement, the user story technique from Extreme Programming has been a popular alternative tool to use cases. However, proponents of the use case description argue that it still has advantages over user story and other descriptions.

User focused

Use cases can function as a user-centric tool for the software requirements specification process, helping developers think through a user's potential needs. Use case modeling typically starts from identifying the key stakeholders (actors) who will interact with the system, and their goals or objectives they will want to meet by using the system. These user goals then inform the construction of use cases which the system should be designed to fulfill. This user-centered approach is intended to determine that the system is developed in a way that is valuable and aligned with user needs, rather than tailored to the developer's insider perspective.

Use case authoring is an analysis tool in the domain of User-Centered Design (UCD).

Better communication

Use cases may be written in natural languages with structured templates. A narrative textual form complemented by visual UML diagrams can improve communication among stakeholders with varying levels of familiarity with the technical aspects of a system by minimizing jargon.

Quality requirements by structured exploration

The formats of use case templates can help system designers analyze a design in a structured way, tracing step by step through the user flow. This may surface subtle but costly design flaws or system requirements that a designer may have otherwise missed. Minimizing and optimizing the action steps of a use case to achieve the user goal also contribute to a better interaction design and user experience of the system.

Facilitate testing and user documentation

With content based upon an action or event flow structure, a model of well-written use cases also serves as groundwork and guidelines for the design of test cases and user manuals of the system or product. There are connections between the flow paths of a use case and its test cases. Deriving functional test cases from a use case through its scenario (running instances of a use case) is straightforward.

== Limitations ==
Limitations of use cases include:

- Use cases are not well suited to capturing non-interaction-based requirements of a system (such as algorithm or mathematical requirements) or non-functional requirements (such as platform, performance, timing, or safety-critical aspects). These are better specified declaratively elsewhere.
- As there are no fully standard definitions of use cases, each project must form its own interpretation.
- Some use case relationships, such as extends, are ambiguous in interpretation and can be difficult for stakeholders to understand as pointed out by Cockburn (Problem #6)
- Use case developers often find it difficult to determine the level of user interface (UI) dependency to incorporate in a use case. While use case theory suggests that UI not be reflected in use cases, it can be awkward to abstract out this aspect of design, as it makes the use cases difficult to visualize. In software engineering, this difficulty is resolved by applying requirements traceability, for example with a traceability matrix. Another approach to associate UI elements with use cases is to attach a UI design to each step in the use case. This is called a use case storyboard.
- Use cases can be over-emphasized. Bertrand Meyer discusses issues such as driving system design too literally from use cases, and using use cases to the exclusion of other potentially valuable requirements analysis techniques.
- Use cases are a starting point for test design, but since each test needs its own success criteria, use cases may need to be modified to provide separate post-conditions for each path.
- Though use cases include goals and contexts, whether these goals and motivations behind the goals (stakeholders' concerns and their assessments including non-interaction) conflict or negatively/positively affect other system goals are subject of goal-oriented requirement modeling techniques (such as BMM, I*, KAOS and ArchiMate ARMOR).

== Misconceptions ==
Common misunderstandings about use cases are:

User stories are agile; use cases are not.

Agile and Scrum are neutral on requirement techniques. As the Scrum Primer states,

Product Backlog items are articulated in any way that is clear and sustainable. Contrary to popular misunderstanding, the Product Backlog does not contain "user stories"; it simply contains items. Those items can be expressed as user stories, use cases, or any other requirements approach that the group finds useful. But whatever the approach, most items should focus on delivering value to customers.

Use case techniques have evolved to take Agile approaches into account by using use case slices to incrementally enrich a use case.

Use cases are mainly diagrams.

Craig Larman stresses that "use cases are not diagrams, they are text".

Use cases have too much UI-related content.

As some put it,

Use cases will often contain a level of detail (i.e. naming of labels and buttons) which make it not well suited for capturing the requirements for a new system from scratch.

Novice misunderstandings. Each step of a well-written use case should present actor goals or intentions (the essence of functional requirements), and normally it should not contain any user interface details, e.g. naming of labels and buttons, UI operations, etc., which is a bad practice and will unnecessarily complicate the use case writing and limit its implementation.

As for capturing requirements for a new system from scratch, use case diagrams plus use case briefs are often used as handy and valuable tools, at least as lightweight as user stories.

Writing use cases for large systems is tedious and a waste of time.

As some put it,

The format of the use case makes it difficult to describe a large system (e.g. CRM system) in less than several hundred pages. It is time-consuming and you will find yourself spending time doing an unnecessary amount of rework.

Spending much time writing tedious use cases which add no or little value and result in a lot of rework is a bad smell indicating that the writers are not well skilled and have little knowledge of how to write quality use cases both efficiently and effectively. Use cases should be authored in an iterative, incremental, and evolutionary (agile) way. Applying use case templates does not mean that all the fields of a use case template should be used and filled out comprehensively from up-front or during a special dedicated stage, i.e. the requirement phase in the traditional waterfall development model.

In fact, the use case formats formulated by those popular template styles, e.g. the RUP's and the Cockburn's (also adopted by the OUM method), etc., have been proved in practice as helpful tools for capturing, analyzing and documenting complex requirements of large systems. The quality of a good use case documentation (model) should not be judged largely or only by its size. It is possible as well that a quality and comprehensive use case model of a large system may end up into hundreds of pages mainly because of the inherent complexity of the problem in hand, not because of the poor writing skills of its authors.

== Tools ==
Text editors and/or word processors with template support are often used to write use cases. For large and complex system requirements, dedicated use case tools are helpful.

Some of the well-known use case tools include:

- CaseComplete
- Enterprise Architect
- MagicDraw
- Rational Software's RequisitePro – one of the early, well-known use case and requirement management tools in the 1990s.
- Software Ideas Modeler
- Wiki software – good tools for teams to author and manage use cases collaboratively.

Most UML tools support both the text writing and visual modeling of use cases.

== See also ==
- Abuse case
- Business case
- Entity–control–boundary
- Event partitioning
- Feature
- List of UML tools
- Misuse case
- Requirement
- Requirements elicitation
- Scenario
- Storyboard
- Test case
- Use case points
