= Ingeman Arbnor =

Swedish economist

- Born: 25 January 1949 (age 77)
- Education: Doctor, Lund University
- Occupations: Consultant, Writer
- Children: 3
- Writing career
- Notable work: Methodology for Creating Business Knowledge

Ingeman Arbnor (born 25 January 1949) is a Swedish economist, Professor at the Lund University, Lund, known for his international bestseller Methodology for Creating Business Knowledge written with Björn Bjerke.

== Biography ==
Ingeman Arbnor was born in Sweden in 1949, and studied Economics at the Lund University. A few years, later Arbnor was appointed to his first professorial position at the Lund University. Björn Bjerke supervised the final phase of Arbnor's doctoral work and a deep professional relation developed, resulting in their becoming coauthors. It is out of this relationship that "Methodology for Creating Business Knowledge" was born and developed. His dissertation containing what is now considered classic methodological reorientations.

Arbnor further worked as an entrepreneur in the field of establishing a running business training and development centers in cooperation with multinational corporations in Sweden. Among other business accomplishments, he has started a trading house, a Venture Competence Invest, and an academy for venture management education.

Since the 1990s, he has been a member of the expert group to the Swedish Association of Graduates in Business Administration and Economics.

== Work ==
Arbnor's research interest is in the fields of organizational studies, management, research methodology and multimedia as the ultimate approach to allocating competence for the learning society.

=== Methodology for Creating Business Knowledge ===
The book Methodology for Creating Business Knowledge (1997) wants to give the reader a foundation for handling questions about knowledge creation and for doing research efficiently and effectively in different situations and for various clients and employers. It describes and compares three different methodological approaches for gaining business knowledge:

- the analytical approach,
- the systems approach,
- and the actor's approach.

The Analytic Approach is the positivist approach, the Systems Approach favors the development of explanatory models and the Actors Approach is more commonly known as "structuration theory," which derives from the work of Anthony Giddens, Central Problems in Social Theory from 1979 and The Constitution of Society: Outline of the Theory of Structuration from 1984.

It then examines the consequences of using each approach in various practical and theoretical situations. Techniques discussed include historical studies, case studies, dialogues, language development, collecting data, measurement, controlling reliability, and validation. Arbnor & Bjerke further argue that qualitative research methods must be consistent with the epistemological presumptions of the researcher, the theory and the research problem.

== Publications ==
Arbnor has written some 14 books, mostly in Swedish. A selection:

- 1977. Phenomenology as a Guide to Research, in: L. Bennigson (ed.), Management Studies. Lund: Studentlitteratur.
- 1997. Methodology for Creating Business Knowledge. With Björn Bjerke. California : Sage Publications. (Third Edition 2009).
