= Software durability =

In software engineering, software durability means the solution ability of serviceability of software and to meet user's needs for a relatively long time. Software durability is important for user's satisfaction. For a software security to be durable, it must allow an organization to adjust the software to business needs that are constantly evolving, often in impulsive ways.

Durability of software depends on four characteristics mainly; i.e. software trustworthiness, Human Trust for Serviceability, software dependability and software usability.
