= Software requirements =

Programming concept

Software requirements for a system are the description of what the system should do, the service or services that it provides and the constraints on its operation. The IEEE Standard Glossary of Software Engineering Terminology defines a requirement as:

1. A condition or capability needed by a user to solve a problem or achieve an objective
2. A condition or capability that must be met or possessed by a system or system component to satisfy a contract, standard, specification, or other formally imposed document
3. A documented representation of a condition or capability as in 1 or 2

The activities related to working with software requirements can broadly be broken down into elicitation, analysis, specification, and management.

Note that the wording Software requirements is additionally used in software release notes to explain, which depending on software packages are required for a certain software to be built/installed/used.

== Elicitation ==
Elicitation is the gathering and discovery of requirements from stakeholders and other sources. A variety of techniques can be used such as joint application design (JAD) sessions, interviews, document analysis, focus groups, etc. Elicitation is the first step of requirements development.

== Analysis ==
Analysis is the logical breakdown that proceeds from elicitation. Analysis involves reaching a richer and more precise understanding of each requirement and representing sets of requirements in multiple, complementary ways.

Requirements Triage or prioritization of requirements is another activity which often follows analysis. This relates to Agile software development in the planning phase, e.g. by Planning poker, however it might not be the same depending on the context and nature of the project and requirements or product/service that is being built.

== Specification ==
Specification involves representing and storing the collected requirements knowledge in a persistent and well-organized fashion that facilitates effective communication and change management. Use cases, user stories, functional requirements, and visual analysis models are popular choices for requirements specification.

== Validation ==
Validation involves techniques to confirm that the correct set of requirements has been specified to build a solution that satisfies the project's business objectives, and to detect and correct errors in the requirements before implementation.

== Management ==
Requirements change during projects and there are often many of them. Management of this change becomes paramount to ensuring that the correct software is built for the stakeholders.

== Tool support for Requirements Engineering ==
=== Tools for Requirements Elicitation, Analysis and Validation ===
Taking into account that these activities may involve some artifacts such as observation reports (user observation), questionnaires (interviews, surveys and polls), use cases, user stories; activities such as requirement workshops (charrettes), brainstorming, mind mapping, role-playing; and even, prototyping; software products providing some or all of these capabilities can be used to help achieve these tasks.

There is at least one author who advocates, explicitly, for mind mapping tools such as FreeMind; and, alternatively, for the use of specification by example tools such as Concordion. Additionally, the ideas and statements resulting from these activities may be gathered and organized with wikis and other collaboration tools such as Trello. The features actually implemented and standards compliance vary from product to product.

=== Tools for Requirements Specification ===
A Software requirements specification (SRS) document might be created using general-purpose software like a word processor or one of several specialized tools. Some of these tools can import, edit, export and publish SRS documents. It may help to make SRS documents while following a standardised structure and methodology, such as ISO/IEC/IEEE 29148:2018. Likewise, software may or not use some standard to import or export requirements (such as ReqIF) or not allow these exchanges at all.

=== Tools for Requirements Document Verification ===
Tools of this kind verify if there are any errors in a requirements document according to some expected structure or standard.

=== Tools for Requirements Comparison ===
Tools of this kind compare two requirement sets according to some expected document structure and standard.

=== Tools for Requirements Merge and Update ===
Tools of this kind allow the merging and update of requirement documents.

=== Tools for Requirements Traceability ===
Tools of this kind allow tracing requirements to other artifacts such as models and source code (forward traceability) or, to previous ones such as business rules and constraints (backwards traceability).

=== Tools for Model-Based Software or Systems Requirement Engineering ===
Model-based systems engineering (MBSE) is the formalised application of modelling to support system requirements, design, analysis, verification and validation activities beginning in the conceptual design phase and continuing throughout development and later lifecycle phases. It is also possible to take a model-based approach for some stages of the requirements engineering and, a more traditional one, for others. Very many combinations might be possible.

The level of formality and complexity depends on the underlying methodology involved (for instance, i* is much more formal than SysML and, even more formal than UML)

=== Tools for general Requirements Engineering ===
Tools in this category may provide some mix of the capabilities mentioned previously and others such as requirement configuration management and collaboration. The features actually implemented and standards compliance vary from product to product.

There are even more capable or general tools that support other stages and activities. They are classified as ALM tools.

== See also ==
- Requirement
- Requirements engineering
- Software requirements specification (SRS)
- List of requirements engineering tools
- Non-functional requirement
- Performance requirements which are covered by Software performance testing
- Safety requirements
- Security requirements
