= Software product management =

Discipline of product management

Software product management (sometimes referred to as digital product management or just product management depending on the context) is the discipline of building, implementing and managing digital products, taking into account life cycle, user interface and user experience design, use cases, and user audience. It governs the development cycle of a product from its inception to the market or customer delivery and service in order to maximize revenue. This is in contrast to software that is delivered in an ad hoc manner, typically to a limited clientele, e.g. service.

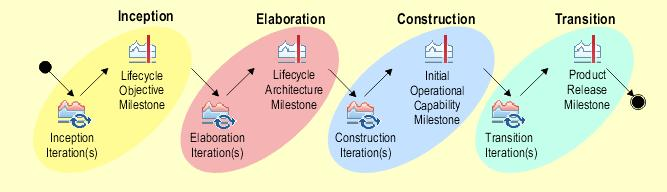
Example of the basic lifecycle of software products

== The need for software product management ==
To develop, sell, and support a successful software product, a business needs to solve its market problem, understand its market, identify the opportunity as well as develop and market an appropriate piece of software. Hence the need for product management as a core business function in software companies.

Hardware and physical product companies may also need software product management, since software and digital systems are often part of the delivery, such as when providing operating systems, or supporting the physical product or software embedded in a device.

== The role of software product manager ==
A software product manager can manage the development of software products from initial stages of development through planned phase-out as a product becomes obsolete, also known as the life cycle of a product. This is often achieved through the use of overseeing technology roadmaps to manage a product's life cycle with careful consideration of maintaining the value chain of a product. One main responsibility of software product managers is to collaborate with other product development teams which may specialize in marketing, sales, engineering, finance, quality assurance, customer service, manufacturing and installation of software systems. Another main responsibility of software product managers is to determine what products, enhancements, and features to build into a software product (or product portfolio, when multiple projects are being managed simultaneously).

Software product managers can specialize in specific aspects of these responsibilities, depending on their focus: product owner, product marketing manager, technical product manager, and strategic product manager.

== Stages of software product management ==
Software product management covers all steps from the inception of a product to its end of life. It consists of five major stages in the product life-cycle, namely:

- Strategy
- Concept phase
- Market entry
- Development
- Evolution

Within these five phases it deals with the following aspects of a software product within a software and/or hardware company:

- Idea generation (e.g., on whiteboards) for a new software product, or for the next version of an existing product.
- Collection and prioritization (see below) of business and/or market requirements from prospects, customers of earlier versions of the product, domain experts, technology visionaries, market experts, products / solutions from competing vendors, etc.
- Crafting of Marketing Requirements Documents, or MRDs, which synthesize the requirements / needs of various stakeholders as outlined above.
- Using the MRD as a basis, come up with a product requirements document or PRD, as an input to the engineering team to build out the product. A PRD is generally not the same as a functional specification since it specifies what a product should do, but not how the product should do it. Frequently, a PRD can be a collection of UML Use Cases, UML Activity Diagrams, HTML mockups, etc. It can have other details such as the software development environment, and the software deployment environment (client-server, web, etc.).
- Deliver the PRD to the software engineering team, and manage conflicts between the business units, the sales teams, and the engineering teams, as it applies to the software products to be built out.
- Once the software development gets into build / release cycle, conduct acceptance tests.
- Deal with the delivery of the product. This can vary from demonstrating the product to customers using web-based conferencing tools, to building product demonstrations, to other placement and promotion tactics. Frequently, in Silicon Valley, these two aspects of marketing, and sometimes also pricing, are dealt with by Product Marketing Managers, as opposed to Product Managers.
- Once the product is deployed at a customer site, solicit customer feedback, report software bugs, and pass these on back to engineering for subsequent build / release cycles, as the product stabilizes, and then matures.
- Perform competitive analysis as to how this product is behaving in the market, vis-a-vis other products catering to the same / similar customer segments. In the software space, this might require the product manager to take the opinion of analysts, who can come from name brand market research firms like IDC, Forrester Research, and Gartner Group.
- Solicit more features and benefits from the users of the software product, users of competitive products, and from analysts and craft / synthesize these requirements for subsequent product build / release cycles and pass them on to the software engineering team.

The above tasks are not sequential but can co-exist. For Product Managers to be efficient in the above tasks, they have to have both engineering and marketing skills. Hence, frequently, Silicon Valley firms prefer engineers who are also MBAs to do software product management.

Another concept of Product Lifecycle Management provides 4 key stages that a product will move through in its life, which are:

- Launch stage - during this stage, the product is launched into the market and will attract early adopters.
- Growth stage - during this stage, the product is iterated on and grows its market share, attracting a core customer base.
- Maturity stage - at this stage, the product is no longer growing but is well-established in the market.
- Decline stage - at this stage, for various reasons, the product will be declining in market share.

For each of these stages, the roadmaps and strategies of the Product Manager and Marketing will have a different focus.

== Education ==
Industry and academia established a standard for software product management education. According to this consensus, a software product manager is educated in the following areas:

- Core practices: product strategy and product planning,
- Participation in strategic management,
- Orchestration of development, of marketing, of sales and distribution, and of service and support.

A software product manager also has knowledge in the software development domain. The International Software Product Management Association (ISPMA) maintains the public body of knowledge and syllabi for international certification.

== Prioritization ==
A key aspect of product management is the correct prioritization of enhancements. User story mapping is a valuable tool that assists with visualizing and organizing priorities. Here's a method that works well (borrowed and adapted from Joel Spolsky):

- Identify the panel, i.e., whose opinion you are going to seek.
- Make a list of all items.
- Estimate the effort required (either in days or in money) - this needs to be very rough and approximate.
- Add up the total effort E.
- Give the panel members a budget of 0.5 × E each - they can place this any way they like, including all on a single item. You should disclose the rough estimates to the panel, as it may influence their vote.
- Rank the items in terms of the ratio votes / estimate.
- Do as many of the items as the actual budget allows, respecting the sequence.

== See also ==
- Product life cycle management
- Product discovery
- CCU Delivery
- Product management
- Software licensing
- Requirements engineering
- Requirements management
