= CPRE (disambiguation) =

CPRE is a countryside charity in England

CPRE may also refer to:

- Certified Professional for Requirements Engineering, administered by the International Requirements Engineering Board
- Consortium for Policy Research and Education, founded by Susan Fuhrman
- Certified Park & Recreation Executive, a professional designation in the United States
