= Process patterns =

Process patterns can be defined as the set of activities, actions, work tasks or work products and similar related behaviour followed in a software development life cycle.

Process patterns can be more easily understood by dividing it into terms: "Process", which means the steps followed to achieve a task and "patterns", which means the recurrence of same basic features during the lifecycle of a process. Thus in a more universal term process patterns are common or general solution for a complexity.

Typical examples are:

1. Customer communication (a process activity).
2. Analysis (an action).
3. Requirements gathering (a process task).
4. Reviewing a work product (a process task).
5. Design model (a work product).

Process patterns can be best seen in software design cycle which involves the common stages of development. For example, a generic software design life cycles has following steps:

1. Communication.
2. Planning.
3. Modeling which involves requirement gathering, analysis and design from business perspective.
4. Development which involves code generation and testing.
5. Deployment includes the code deployment and testing in the production environment.
