= FURPS =

Model for classifying software quality attributes

FURPS (Functionality, usability, reliability, performance, supportability) is a model for classifying software quality attributes (functional and non-functional requirements):

== Model ==
- Functionality - capability (size and generality of feature set), reusability (compatibility, interoperability, portability), security (safety and exploitability)
- Usability (UX) - human factors, aesthetics, consistency, documentation, responsiveness
- Reliability - availability (failure frequency (robustness/durability/resilience), failure extent and time-length (recoverability/survivability)), predictability (stability), accuracy (frequency/severity of error)
- Performance - speed, efficiency, resource consumption (power, ram, cache, etc.), throughput, capacity, scalability
- Supportability (serviceability, maintainability, sustainability, repair speed) - testability, flexibility (modifiability, configurability, adaptability, extensibility, modularity), installability, localizability

The model, developed at Hewlett-Packard was first publicly elaborated by Grady and Caswell. FURPS+ is now widely used in the software industry. The + was later added to the model after various campaigns at HP to extend the acronym to emphasize various attributes, such as Design Requirements, Implementation Requirements, Interface Requirements and Physical Requirements.

== See also ==
- Types of requirements
- Expanded list of types of requirements
