= Product fit analysis =

A Product fit analysis (PFA) is a form of requirements analysis of the gap between an IT product's functionality and required functions. It is a document which consists of all the business requirements which are mapped to the product or application.

Requirements are specifically mentioned and the application is designed accordingly.

A PFA document is designed covering all the functionality required by the business and how it is addressed in the application. It covers all the data inputs, data processing and data outputs.
