= International Requirements Engineering Board =

German certification organisation

International Requirements Engineering Board (IREB e.V.)
- Formation: October 2006
- Type: NPO
- Legal status: Association
- Purpose: Educational
- Location: Karlsruhe, Germany
- Region served: Worldwide
- Members: private persons
- Board of directors: Dr. Kim Lauenroth (Executive Board Chair); Rainer Grau; Hans-Jörg Steffe; Gunnar Harde
- Volunteers: ~120
- Website: ireb.org

The International Requirements Engineering Board (IREB) e.V. was founded in Fürth in Germany in October 2006. IREB e.V. is as a legal entity based in Germany.

The IREB is the holder for the international certification schemes Certified Professional for Requirements Engineering (CPRE) and Digital Design Professional (DDP).

It is IREB's role to support, universally accepted, international qualification schemes, aimed at Requirements Engineering and Digital Design for professionals, by providing the core syllabi and by setting guidelines for accreditation and examination. The accreditation process and certifications are regulated by the steering committee of IREB. The steering committee of IREB is built out of the personal members of IREB. Personal members of the IREB are international experts in requirements engineering from universities, the economy and education.

== Certified Professional for Requirements Engineering ==
The IREB Certified Professional for Requirements Engineering (CPRE) is an international accepted qualification for requirements engineers and business analysts. The CPRE is a four level certification based on exams covering the freely available syllabus. Candidates who have successfully passed the examination receive the "Certified Professional for Requirements Engineering" certificate.

The certificate is set up according to the ISO/IEC 17024 standard with a clear separation of the duties

- IREB is responsible for the definition of syllabi and exams
- Independent Training Providers provide trainings
- Independent organizations provide the certification process

IREB is neither offering trainings nor conducting exams itself.

The education program is offered in 105 countries with over 90.000 IREB Certified Professionals for Requirements Engineering worldwide (date: 2026).

=== Syllabi ===
==== CPRE Foundation Level ====
The IREB Syllabus for the CPRE Foundation Level of the IREB Certified Professional for Requirements Engineering sets the following priorities:

- The focus is on acquiring the necessary practical knowledge and learning the basic concepts in Requirements Engineering, with reinforcement through practical exercises. There is no intention of presenting the complete theoretical framework or current and future research activities.
- The Foundation Level seeks to convey fundamentals that are equally valid for any domain, e.g. for embedded systems, security systems, classic information systems, etc. In addition, the training can cover the suitability of the presented approaches for the various domains based on their special characteristics. However, it is not a goal to present specific Requirements Engineering for a given domain.
- The syllabus is not based on a specific procedural model and an associated process model that stipulate the planning, control and order of carrying out the learned concepts in actual practice. No specific Requirements Engineering or even software engineering process is emphasized.
- The syllabus defines necessary knowledge of a Requirements Engineer. However, it does not elaborate on the exact interfaces between this field and other software engineering disciplines and processes. Nor is any attempt made to define other roles occurring in IT projects.
- The syllabus does not attempt to convey all methods and techniques that are used in Requirements Engineering. Rather, the course represents today’s most commonly used set of methods and techniques. Above all, the course intends to inspire attendees to actively gain for more experience in Requirements Engineering on their own authority

The CPRE Foundation Level certificate is recognized by the British Computer Society as an equivalent to the BCS Certificate in Requirements Engineering

The Syllabus for the CPRE Foundation Level is available in 13 languages: Chinese, Dutch, English, French, German, Italian, Korean, Spanish, Polish, Persian, Portuguese, Russian and Swedish.

==== CPRE Advanced Levels ====
The CPRE Advanced Levels consists of a set of modules which offer sound knowledge in specific areas of the CPRE Foundation Level Syllabus. There are two Advanced Levels, Practitioner and Specialist, both covering four modules. They are all available in English and German, some are available in other languages as well:

===== Advanced Level Requirements Elicitation =====
Different sources of requirements are discussed along with many elicitation techniques like questioning techniques, observation techniques, creativity techniques and artifact-based techniques. Conflict resolution is supported by a variety of consolidation techniques and clear guidelines as to which situation to use which technique.

===== Advanced Level Requirements Modeling =====
How to use models for requirements elicitation and documentation. The main focus is on modeling of information structures, functions, behavior and scenarios in Requirements Engineering.

===== Advanced Level Requirements Management =====
This module focus on appropriate methods and techniques to effectively deal with the management of requirements throughout the product development.

===== Advanced Level RE@Agile =====
This module focuses on how to apply RE methods and techniques in agile development processes - and vice versa.

==== CPRE Expert level ====
The Expert Level is aimed at real requirements engineering experts who hold at least three CPRE Advanced Level certificates, are actively working as requirements engineers and provide their knowledge in the field of requirements engineering as trainers or coaches.

=== Training ===
The contents of each syllabus are taught as courses by training providers, which have been acknowledged by IREB. They are globally marketed under the brand "Certified Professional for Requirements Engineering". Training is not mandatory, self-study is possible.

=== Exams ===
==== CPRE Foundation Level exam ====
The CPRE Foundation Level exam is a multiple choice test. It can be taken in 13 languages: Chinese, Dutch, English, French, German, Italian, Korean, Persian, Portuguese (Brazil), Polish, Spanish, Swedish, and Russian. The details of the exam are regulated in the exam regulations for the CPRE Foundation Level

For the CPRE Foundation Level exam there are no prerequisites a candidate has to fulfill in order to take the exam. Training is not mandatory, self-study is possible.

For preparation a practice exam for the CPRE Foundation Level is free available on the IREB website.

The personal members de:Klaus Pohl (Informatiker) and de:Chris Rupp are authors of the book Requirements Engineering Fundamentals as reference teaching book to prepare for the exam "Certified Professional for Requirements Engineering" in the Foundation Level.

The CPRE Foundation Level certificate is valid unlimited, there is no need for recertification.

==== CPRE Advanced Level exams ====
The CPRE Practitioner exam is a multiple choice test (similar to the Foundation level). The CPRE Specialist exam is a written assignment which has to be elaborated by the candidate. The details of the exams are regulated in the exam regulations for the CPRE Practitioner and the CPRE Specialist

For the CPRE Practitioner Level exam a candidate has to hold a CPRE Foundation Level certificate as a prerequisite in order to take the exam. The BCS Certificate in Requirements Engineering is accepted as an equivalent to the CPRE Foundation Level certificate. For the CPRE Specialist Level exam a candidate has to hold a CPRE Practitioner Level certificate of the same module.

For preparation a practice exams are free available on the IREB website.

The CPRE Advanced Level certificates are valid unlimited, there is no need for recertification.

=== Certification ===
According to the ISO/IEC 17024 standard the certification is provided by independent organizations (certification bodies) which are licensed by IREB. The duties of the certification bodies:

- Conduct Foundation Level and Advanced Level exams
- Evaluate the exams
- Issue the certificates

== See also ==
- Requirements engineering
- Business analysis

== Literature ==
- Pohl, Klaus; Rupp, Chris (2011). Requirements Engineering Fundamentals. www.rockynook.com. ISBN 978-1-933952-81-9.
