= Business analyst =

Refers to a person who analyses and documents business processes

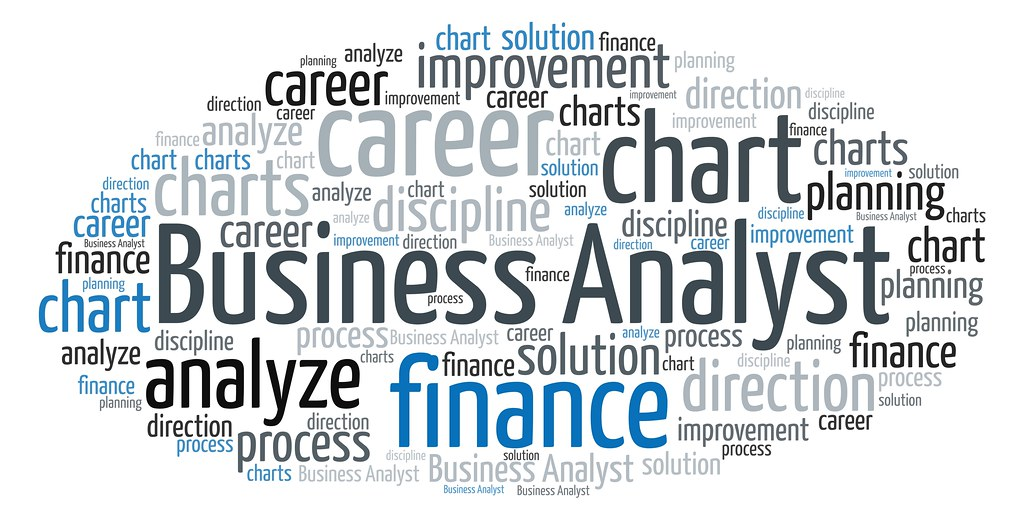
Business analyst word cloud indicating some aspects of the business analyst profession (Flickr)

A business analyst (BA) is a person who processes, interprets and documents business processes, products, services and software through analysis of data. The role of a business analyst is to ensure business efficiency increases through their knowledge of both IT and business function.

Some tasks of a business analyst include creating detailed business analysis, budgeting and forecasting, business strategizing, planning and monitoring, variance analysis, pricing, reporting and defining business requirements for stakeholders. The business analyst role is applicable to four key areas/levels of business functions – operational, project, enterprise and competitive focuses. Each of these areas of business analysis have a significant impact on business performance, and assist in enhancing profitability and efficiency in all stages of the business process, and across all business functions.

== Role ==
Business analysis has been defined as "a disciplined approach for introducing change to organization" through management, processing, and interpretation of data in order to "identify and define the solution that will maximize the value delivered by an organization to its stakeholders".

A business analyst's job description tends to include "creating detailed business analysis, outlining problems, opportunities and solutions for a business, budgeting and forecasting, planning and monitoring, variance and analysis, pricing, reporting, and defining business requirements and reporting back to stakeholders".

Business analysts are involved in various business activities. Some areas in which business analysts can have an important role are in financial analysis, quality assurance, training, business policy and procedures, market analysis, organizational development and solution testing. More specifically, business analysts analyze collected data to derive meaningful insights for the business. This can then be used to improve business performance through identifying areas for potential growth, cost reduction, understanding customer behavior, and observing economic trends and forecasts, and then reacting appropriately.

Successful business analysts should influence the business environment by providing reliable guidance in decision making for the future through observing data which reflects the behavior of the business in the past. Business analysts are essential at all levels of a business, as both tactical and strategic planning require analysts who help with "incremental improvements to products, business processes, and application".

Business analysts have an increasing need to provide a business with sustainable solutions. The Business Analyst "plays a key role in making sustainable choices, providing direction to business and influencing demand for specific technologies". Business analysis practices have the opportunity to use business data in a positive way, which can lead to the transition of a sustainable world.

== Areas of business analysis ==
=== Business focuses ===
Due to wide range of applications of business analysts, there are specific areas in which they can function. Kathleen B. Haas describes the requirement of business analysts in four areas of business – operations focus, project focus, enterprise focus, and competitive focus.

1. Operations focus – business analysts are able to use big data to analyze the way in which a business's operations are impacting the ability of the business to generate business value. Business analysts add value to the operational level of a business by enabling efficiency to be maximized through cost cuts, investing in better equipment, improving employee efficiency, and increasing production of popular products.
2. Project focus – when a business analyst takes charge of a project, areas that are historically overlooked are more likely to be considered carefully. The business analyst has an essential role in projects, which includes "integrating strategic planning with portfolio planning for Information Systems and technology", inclusion of the possible effects of business decisions on future performance, and the use of modelling tools to demonstrate the "as-is" and "to-be" business to all employees across various levels of the business.
3. Enterprise focus – a business analyst who works in this area of a business helps to "optimize development of innovative solutions" through the use of technology. Activities involved in an enterprise-focused business analyst's job include building current and future business architecture, conducting analyses of opportunities, problems and feasibility, proposing new projects to build solutions, validating forecasts and assumptions being made, conducting solution assessments and validation, comparing planned and actual results of business plans.
4. Competitive focus – the competitive environment is analyzed by business analysts "in order to develop a meaningful strategy" for all areas of a business. One of the main functions of business which this is relevant in is marketing. By observing consumer behavior when interacting with a business's products and the products of its competitors, as well as the distinctiveness of brands in the consumer space, information about substitutability and product performance can be determined.

=== Specific business analyst roles ===
Business analyst skills can be applied to a variety of roles within business processes.

- Business analyst
- Business systems analyst
- Systems analyst
- Requirements engineer
- Process analyst
- Product analyst
- Product manager
- Product owner
- Enterprise analyst
- Business architect
- Management consultant
- Business intelligence analyst
- Data scientist
- Customer Relationship Management

Business analysts can also work in areas relating to project management, product management, software development, quality assurance and interaction design.

== Skills and qualifications ==
=== Skills ===
- Oral and written communication skills
- Facilitation, and interpersonal and consultative skills
- Analytical thinking and problem solving
- Being detail-oriented and capable of delivering a high level accuracy
- Organizational skills
- Knowledge of business structure
- Stakeholder analysis
- Requirements engineering
- Cost benefit analysis
- Processes modelling
- Understanding of networks, databases and other technology

These skills are a combination of hard skills and soft skills. A business analyst should have knowledge in IT and/or business, but the combination of both of these fields is what makes a business analyst such a valuable asset to the business environment. As a minimum standard, a business analyst should have a "general understanding of how systems, products and tools work" in the business environment.

Some IT employees may transfer from the area of IT into a business analyst role, as their skills are often applicable in both.

There are broader categorized skill sets which business analysts require in the work place.

1. Mediation - business analysts are a useful "liaison support role" between business professionals and IT professionals in the workplace. The business analyst role is an overlap of these two professions, and therefore the business analyst plays an essential role in communication and understanding between these two groups.
2. Requirements elicitation - this refers to "analyzing and gathering the needs of both computer-based systems as well as the business". Successful requirements elicitation can help to improve and eliminate quality and defective requirements respectively at an early point in the product lifecycle, and can therefore minimize wastage and maximize business success simultaneously.
3. Solution designer - business analysts can contribute to the design of business functions and processes through the analysis of past performance and certain areas for improvement.
4. Business modelling - forecasting, modelling and analyzing current and future business performance, functions and processes are essential to the business analyst role. These skills enable the business analyst to make educated business decisions.
5. Business problem analysis - a business analyst must be able to analyze the issues a business is facing in order to determine how they impact business performance, and how the business can overcome these problems with maximum efficiency.
6. Information System (IS) strategy evaluation - business analysts are required to continually monitor and control the strategic plans of a business, so that it is able to best meet its needs and goals. Part of this involves comparison with competitors and industry trends.

=== Qualifications ===
There are a number of qualifications that can lead to a career as a business analyst.

- Completing a bachelor's degree - this could be in information technology, business administration or economics.
- Completing a master's degree - master's degrees "help add more skills and significantly increase your salary". Examples of master's degrees which are relevant to business analysts include business analytics, business informatics, business intelligence & analytics, data science, management information systems or information technology.

The combination of all these skills and qualifications provides the business environment with deeper understanding into the behaviour of markets, products, competitors, economies, and operations within and around a business.

== Challenges ==
A successful business analyst requires access to large amounts of data, and in the process of using this data they must be aware of challenges relating to data privacy, careful management of analytical resources, team success, and effective communication of results to external parties. Considering all these factors into their tasks reduces the risk of inaccurate conclusions being drawn.

Data privacy is an increasingly common issue, as social media and Big Data are becoming more prominent, and hence it is important for businesses to ensure that they handle and distribute only the necessary data to the appropriate employees.

Management of analytical resources is necessary for business analysts to consider, as there are many ways in which a business can implement high initial costs in the process of analysis of data, and hence resources should be carefully managed so as to not lose business profits.

Team functionality and success is important in all areas of business, and business analytics is no different. Business analysts work best in environments where group dynamics are balanced and teamwork is maximised to ensure the best conclusions are drawn from the data.

Effectively communicating with external parties is a key challenge for business analysts. The terminology used in a business analyst’s day-to-day work can often be complex or difficult for other departments or external stakeholders to understand. Therefore, it is essential for businesses to carefully consider how their findings and conclusions are communicated to ensure clarity and alignment.

== See also ==
- Business process reengineering
- Change management analyst
- Information technology
