= Non-functional requirement =

Type of requirement in systems engineering

In systems engineering and requirements engineering, a non-functional requirement (NFR) is a requirement that specifies criteria that can be used to judge the operation of a system, rather than specific behaviours. They are contrasted with functional requirements that define specific behavior or functions. The plan for implementing functional requirements is detailed in the system design. The plan for implementing non-functional requirements is detailed in the system architecture, because they are usually architecturally significant requirements. Non-functional requirements are also known as cross-functional requirements by some.

In software architecture, non-functional requirements are known as "architectural characteristics". Note that synchronous communication between software architectural components entangles them, and they must share the same architectural characteristics.

== Definition ==
Broadly, functional requirements define what a system is supposed to do and non-functional requirements define how a system is supposed to be. Functional requirements are usually in the form of "system shall do <requirement>", an individual action or part of the system, perhaps explicitly in the sense of a mathematical function, a black box description input, output, process and control functional model or IPO model. In contrast, non-functional requirements are in the form of "system shall be <requirement>", an overall property of the system as a whole or of a particular aspect and not a specific function. The system's overall properties commonly mark the difference between whether the development project has succeeded or failed.

Non-functional requirements are often called the "quality attributes" of a system. The emergent properties (Note: See definition in SeBoK Glossary) of a system are classified as non-functional requirements. Other terms for non-functional requirements are "qualities", "quality goals", "quality of service requirements", "constraints", "non-behavioral requirements", or "technical requirements". Informally these are sometimes called the "ilities", from attributes like stability and portability. Qualities—that is non-functional requirements—can be divided into two main categories:

1. Execution qualities, such as safety, security and usability, which are observable during operation (at run time).
2. Evolution qualities, such as testability, maintainability, extensibility and scalability, which are embodied in the static structure of the system.

As non-functional requirements are all requirements that do not fall into the functional requirements category, they also include both characteristics of the functions and constraints on the system such as non-design items of statutory, regulatory, standards and protocols, or other external requirements.

It is important to specify non-functional requirements in a specific and measurable way.

== Classification of non-functional requirements ==
Common non-functional classifications, relevant for all types of systems include

- Performance
- Reliability, availability, maintainability and safety
- Scalability
- Testability

Specific type of systems explicitly enumerate categories of non-functional requirements in their standards

- Hardware systems
- Embedded systems
- Safety-critical systems
- Software systems

== Examples ==
A system may be required to present the user with a display of the number of records in a database. This is a functional requirement. How current this number needs to be, is a non-functional requirement. If the number needs to be updated in real time, the system architects must ensure that the system is capable of displaying the record count within an acceptably short interval of the number of records changing.

Sufficient network bandwidth may be a non-functional requirement of a system. Other examples include:

- Accessibility
- Adaptability
- Auditability and control
- Availability (see service level agreement)
- Backup
- Boot up time
- Capacity, current and forecast
- Certification
- Compliance
- Configuration management
- Conformance
- Cost, initial and life-cycle cost
- Data integrity
- Data retention
- Dependency on other parties
- Deployment
- Development environment
- Disaster recovery
- Documentation
- Durability
- Efficiency (resource consumption for given load)
- Effectiveness (resulting performance in relation to effort)
- Elasticity
- Emotional factors (like fun or absorbing or has "wow factor")
- Environmental protection
- Escrow
- Ethics
- Exploitability
- Extensibility (adding features, and carry-forward of customizations at next major version upgrade)
- Failure management
- Fault tolerance (e.g. operational system monitoring, measuring, and management)
- Flexibility (e.g. to deal with future changes in requirements)
- Footprint reduction - reduce the exe files size
- Integrability (e.g. ability to integrate components)
- Internationalization and localization
- Interoperability
- Legal and licensing issues or patent-infringement-avoidability
- Maintainability (e.g. mean time to repair – MTTR)
- Management
- Memory optimization
- Modifiability
- Network topology
- Open source
- Operability
- Performance (speed, battery life, throughput, response time (performance engineering))
- Physical (size, weight, power, cooling, etc.)
- Platform compatibility
- Privacy (compliance to privacy laws)
- Portability
- Quality (e.g. faults discovered, faults delivered, fault removal efficacy)
- Readability
- Reliability (e.g. mean time between/to failures – MTBF/MTTF)
- Reporting
- Resilience
- Resource constraints (processor speed, memory, disk space, network bandwidth, etc.)
- Response time
- Reusability
- Robustness
- Safety or factor of safety
- Scalability (horizontal, vertical)
- Schedule (project management) for development and delivery
- Security (cyber and physical)
- Software, tools, standards etc. Compatibility
- Stability
- Supportability
- Testability
- Throughput
- Training
- Transparency
- Usability (human factors) by target user community
- Volume testing

== Criticism ==
The term "non-functional requirement" is criticized for being seen as a misnomer diminishing of the importance of the set of requirements it covers. In its place, the term "cross-functional requirement" (CFR) has been proposed and adopted at ThoughtWorks.

== See also ==
- ISO/IEC 25010:2011
- Consortium for IT Software Quality
- ISO/IEC 9126
- FURPS
- Requirements analysis
- Usability requirements
- Non-Functional Requirements framework
- Architecturally Significant Requirements
- SNAP Points
