= System requirements =

Environment needed to run software

To be used efficiently, all computer software needs certain hardware components or other software resources to be present on a computer. These prerequisites are known as (computer) system requirements and are often used as a guideline as opposed to an absolute rule. Most software defines two sets of system requirements: minimum and recommended. With increasing demand for higher processing power and resources in newer versions of software, system requirements tend to increase over time. Industry analysts suggest that this trend plays a bigger part in driving upgrades to existing computer systems than technological advancements. A second meaning of the term system requirements, is a generalisation of this first definition, giving the requirements to be met in the design of a system or sub-system.

== Recommended system requirements ==
Often manufacturers of games will provide the consumer with a set of requirements that are different from those that are needed to run a software. These requirements are usually called the recommended requirements. These requirements are almost always of a significantly higher level than the minimum requirements, and represent the ideal situation in which to run the software. Generally speaking, this is a better guideline than minimum system requirements in order to have a fully usable and enjoyable experience with that software.

== Hardware requirements ==
The most common set of requirements defined by any operating system or software application is the physical computer resources, also known as hardware, A hardware requirements list is often accompanied by a hardware compatibility list (HCL), especially in case of operating systems. An HCL lists tested, compatible, and sometimes incompatible hardware devices for a particular operating system or application. The following sub-sections discuss the various aspects of hardware requirements.

=== Architecture ===
All computer operating systems are designed for a particular computer architecture. Most software applications are limited to particular operating systems running on particular architectures. Although architecture-independent operating systems and applications exist, most need to be recompiled to run on a new architecture. See also a list of common operating systems and their supporting architectures.

=== Processing power ===
The power of the central processing unit (CPU) is a fundamental system requirement for any software. Most software running on x86 architecture define processing power as the model and the clock speed of the CPU. Many other features of a CPU that influence its speed and power, like bus speed, cache, and MIPS are often ignored. This definition of power is often erroneous, as different makes and models of CPUs at similar clock speed often have different throughput speeds.

=== Memory ===
All software, when run, resides in the random-access memory (RAM) of a computer. Memory requirements are defined after considering demands of the application, operating system, supporting software and files, and other running processes. Optimal performance of other unrelated software running on a multi-tasking computer system is also considered when defining this requirement.

=== Secondary storage ===
Data storage device requirements vary, depending on the size of software installation, temporary files created and maintained while installing or running the software, and possible use of swap space (if RAM is insufficient).

=== Display adapter ===
Software requiring a better than average computer graphics display, like graphics editors and high-end games, often define high-end display adapters in the system requirements.

=== Peripherals ===
Some software applications need to make extensive and/or special use of some peripherals, demanding the higher performance or functionality of such peripherals. Such peripherals include CD-ROM drives, keyboards, pointing devices, network devices, etc.

== Software requirements ==
Software requirements deal with defining software resource requirements and prerequisites that need to be installed on a computer to provide optimal functioning of an application. These requirements or prerequisites are generally not included in the software installation package and need to be installed separately before the software is installed.

=== Platform ===
A computing platform describes some sort of framework, either in hardware or software, which allows software to run. Typical platforms include a computer's architecture, operating system, or programming languages and their runtime libraries.

Operating system is one of the requirements mentioned when defining system requirements (software). Software may not be compatible with different versions of same line of operating systems, although some measure of backward compatibility is often maintained. For example, most software designed for Microsoft Windows XP does not run on Microsoft Windows 98, although the converse is not always true. Similarly, software designed using newer features of Linux Kernel v2.6 generally does not run or compile properly (or at all) on Linux distributions using Kernel v2.2 or v2.4.

=== APIs and drivers ===
Software making extensive use of special hardware devices, like high-end display adapters, needs special API or newer device drivers. A good example is DirectX, which is a collection of APIs for handling tasks related to multimedia, especially game programming, on Microsoft platforms.

=== Web browser ===
Most web applications and software depend heavily on web technologies to make use of the default browser installed on the system. Microsoft Edge is a frequent choice of software running on Microsoft Windows, which makes use of ActiveX controls, despite their vulnerabilities.

== Other requirements ==
Some software also has other requirements for proper performance. Internet connection (type and speed) and resolution of the display screen are notable examples.

== Examples ==
Following are a few examples of system requirement definitions for popular PC games and trend of ever-increasing resource needs:

For instance, while StarCraft (1998) requires:

System requirements
| Requirement | Requirements |
Windows
| Operating system | Windows 95 or NT or superior |
| CPU | Pentium processor at 90 MHz or higher |
| Memory | 16 MB RAM |
| Free space | 80 MB available |
| Media | CD-ROM, 2× speed or higher |
| Graphics hardware | DirectX 3.0 or higher |

Doom 3 (2004) requires:

System requirements
| Requirement | Requirements |
Windows
| Operating system | Windows 2000/XP |
| CPU | Pentium 4 1.5 GHz or Athlon XP 1500+ processor or higher |
| Memory | 384 MB RAM |
| Free space | 2.2 GB free space |
| Media | 8× speed CD-ROM |
| Graphics hardware | 3D Hardware Accelerator – 64MB of memory minimum DirectX 9.0b |
| Sound hardware | DirectX 9.0b compatible 16-bit sound card |

Star Wars: The Force Unleashed (2009) requires:

System requirements
| Requirement | Requirements |
Windows
| Operating system | Windows XP SP3, Windows Vista SP2, Windows 7 |
| CPU | Core 2 Duo or Athlon X2 at 2.4 GHz |
| Memory | 2 GB RAM |
| Free space | 8 GB of free space, 23.8 GB + 1 GB Swap File space |
| Graphics hardware | DirectX 9.0c compatible video card. 3D Hardware Accelerator – 256MB of memory minimum |
| Sound hardware | DirectX 9.0c compatible sound card |

Grand Theft Auto V (2015) requires:

System requirements
| Requirement | Requirements |
Windows
| Operating system | Windows 8.1 64-bit, Windows 8 64-bit, Windows 7 Service Pack 1 64-bit, Windows Vista Service Pack 2 64-bit |
| CPU | Core 2 Quad Q6600 at 2.4 GHz or AMD Phenom 9850 at 2.5 GHz |
| Memory | 4 GB RAM |
| Free space | 65 GB of free space |
| Graphics hardware | DirectX 10-compatible GPU: GeForce 9800GT 1GB or ATI Radeon HD 4870 1GB |
| Sound hardware | DirectX 10 compatible sound card |

Baldur's Gate 3 (2023) requires:

System requirements
| Requirement | Requirements |
Windows
| Operating system | Windows 10 64-bit |
| CPU | Intel Core i5-4690 / AMD FX 8350 |
| Memory | 8 GB RAM |
| Free space | 150 GB of free space (SSD only) |
| Graphics hardware | Nvidia GeForce GTX 970 4 GB / AMD Radeon RX 480 4 GB |

== See also ==
- Requirement
- Requirements analysis
- Software Requirements Specification
- Specification (technical standard)
- System requirements specification (SyRS)
