= ERTMS Regional =

ERTMS Regional is a simplified and low-cost variant of the European Rail Traffic Management System suitable for train control on lines with low traffic volumes. It is intended to reduce the amount of lineside and equipment required, thus reducing costs, increasing reliability and improving safety for track workers.

== History ==
The ERTMS Regional project was started at the end of the 1990s under the name ETCS LC (Low Cost). In recent years, its development was pushed by the Swedish Rail Administration in cooperation with the UIC organization.

Standardization reached a point in 2009 that the Swedish Rail Administration ordered the equipping of a pilot railway track on the 129-kilometer West Dalarna Line between Malung and Repbäcken in Sweden. Test operation started in 2010, and it has been fully operational (ERTMS only) since February 2012. Unfortunately the high cost of equipping passenger trains with ERTMS caused cancellation of all passenger traffic on this line in 2011.

There were plans to install it on two Swedish freight-only railways in 2012-2013, but that did not happen. The Swedish Rail Administration decided in 2014 not to install ERTMS Regional on any further railway at least before 2020, citing high and uncertain future development cost, risk of problems and lack of expertise, who need to focus on the coming installation on normal ERTMS level 2 on the mainlines.

In 2017 ERTMS Regional trial test runs started in Italy, mainly on the Avezzano-Roccasecca railway line. Rete Ferroviaria Italiana (RFI) plans to introduce this on several low traffic railways.

== Characteristics ==
The ERTMS Regional standard does only describe the way-side signals that is modeled to be compatible with trains equipped with ETCS L3 train control systems. There is also an optional variant to allow trains with ETCS level 2 train control systems to access ERTMS Regional tracks. Unlike ETCS level 3 the ERTMS Regional scheme is not supposed to operate with moving blocks. Instead it uses radio-based interlocking to lower the amount of track-release signalling devices.

The ERTMS Regional standard explicitly states that the track should not be equipped with any other automatic train protection system. Only the provisions of ERTMS Regional should be used for train protection / collision avoidance.

The central element of ERTMS Regional is the specification on the Train Control Center (TCC). This computer system takes over the functionality of Interlocking, ETCS Radio Block Center (RBC) as well as automatic planning and track management.

All communication between ERTMS Regional track equipment and the trains is done with GSM-R. Track-side elements like switches, derailers, level crossings, block signals, moveable bridges are equipped with an Object Controller OC that connects directly to the Train Control Center.

In opposite to other ERTMS variants, ERTMS Regional does not require GSM-R coverage everywhere. There is no mandatory automatic protection against collision with cars accidentally lost by other trains, or parked and forgotten. ERTMS Regional has a fairly low speed limit, and is meant for railways which today has no automatic train protection system, only manual supervision and optical signals. A decision was made in Sweden that passenger traffic is permitted only if there is automatic detection (by e.g. track circuits) of forgotten vehicles on the tracks meant for passenger trains at freight yards or similar places trains might park, and also that when shunting or similar activity has taken place, the next train must move very slowly in the concerned area, and the speed has been limited to 70 km/h on West Dalarna Line. In the manual system, the train dispatcher is assumed to see such forgotten vehicles, while with ERTMS Regional, the railway can be directed remotely. Because of need to further develop ERTMS Regional and unknown cost for that, Sweden will not use it on passenger railways for some years.

== See also ==
- Positive Train Control
