= European Train Control System =

Railway signaling system

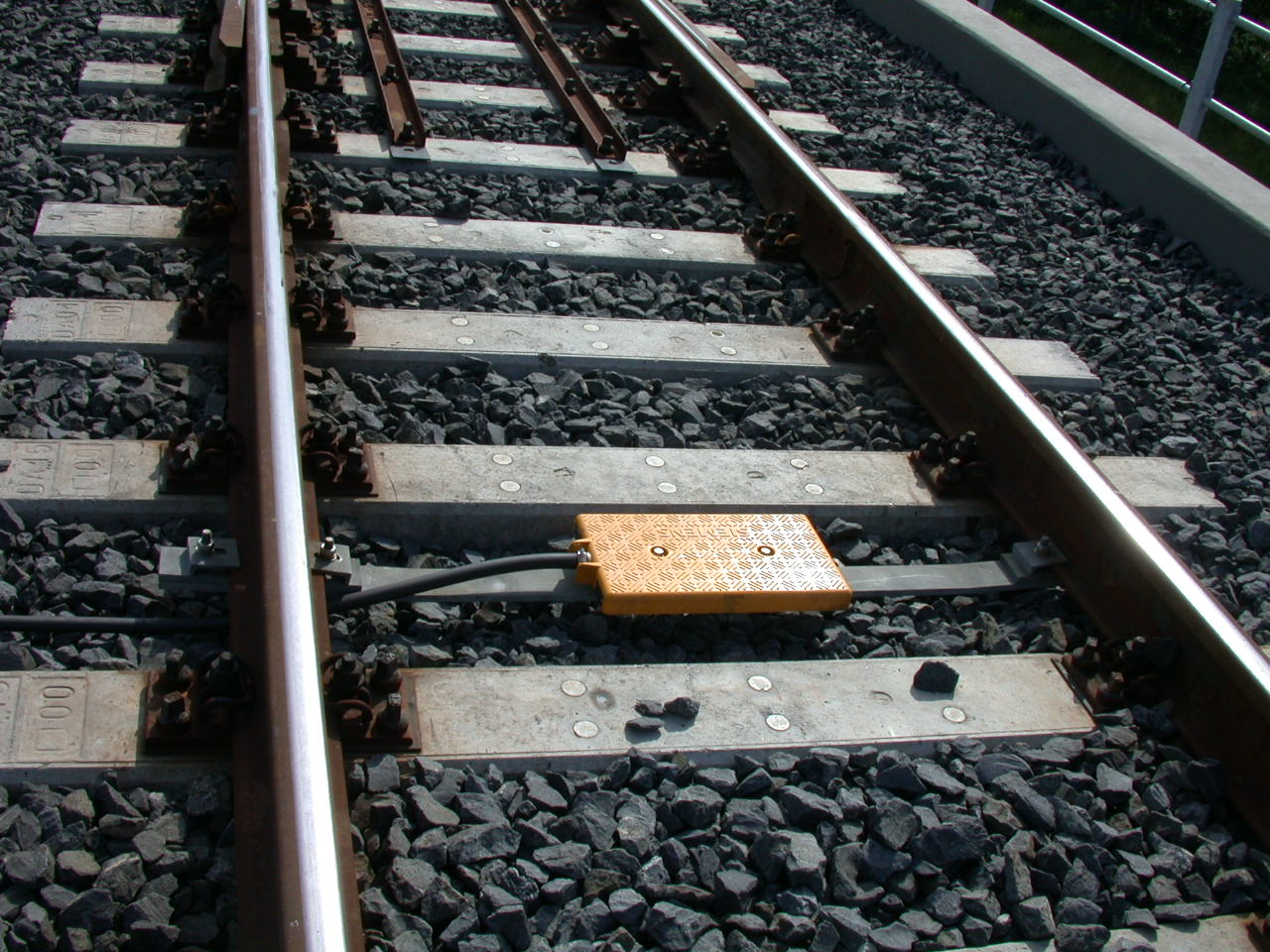
ETCS—"Eurobalise" transceiver, installed between rails, provides information to ETCS trains.

The European Train Control System (ETCS) is a train protection system designed to replace the many incompatible systems used by European railways and railways outside of Europe. ETCS is the signalling and control component of the European Rail Traffic Management System (ERTMS). It has two major parts: trackside equipment and on-board (on train) equipment.

ETCS can allow all trackside information to be passed to the driver cab, removing the need for trackside signals. This is the foundation for future automatic train operation (ATO). Trackside equipment aims to exchange information with the vehicle for safely supervising train circulation. The information exchanged between track and trains can be either continuous or intermittent, according to the ERTMS/ETCS level of application and to the nature of the information itself.

The need for a system like ETCS stems from more and longer-running trains resulting from economic integration of the European Union (EU) and the liberalisation of national railway markets. At the beginning of the 1990s, there were some national high speed train projects supported by the EU which lacked interoperability of trains. This catalysed the Directive 1996/48 about the interoperability of high-speed trains, followed by Directive 2001/16 extending the concept of interoperability to the conventional rail system. ETCS specifications have become part of, or are referred to by, the Technical Specifications for Interoperability (TSI) for (railway) control-command systems, pieces of European legislation managed by the European Union Agency for Railways (ERA). It is a legal requirement that all new, upgraded or renewed tracks and rolling stock in the European railway system adopt ETCS, possibly keeping legacy systems for backwards compatibility. Many networks outside the EU have also adopted ETCS, generally for high-speed rail projects. The main goal of achieving interoperability had mixed success in the beginning.

== History ==
The European railway network grew from separate national networks with little more in common than standard gauge. Notable differences included voltages, loading gauge, couplings, signalling and control systems. By the end of the 1980s there were 14 national standard train control systems in use across the EU, and the advent of high-speed trains showed that signalling based on lineside signals was insufficient.

Both factors led to efforts to reduce the time and cost of cross-border traffic. On 4 and 5 December 1989, a working group including Transport Ministers resolved a master plan for a trans-European high-speed rail network, the first time that ETCS was suggested. The commission communicated the decision to the European Council, which approved the plan in its resolution of 17 December 1990. This led to a resolution on 91/440/EEC as of 29 July 1991, which mandated the creation of a requirement list for interoperability in high-speed rail transport. The rail manufacturing industry and rail-network operators had already agreed upon the creation of interoperability standards in June 1991. By 1993 an organizational framework was created to start technical specifications that would be published as Technical Specifications for Interoperability (TSI). The mandate for TSI was resolved by 93/38/EEC. In 1995, a development plan first mentioned the creation of the European Rail Traffic Management System (ERTMS).

Because ETCS is in many parts implemented in software, some wording from software technology is used. Versions are called system requirements specifications (SRS). These are bundles of documents which may have different versioning for each document. A main version is called a baseline (BL).

=== Baseline 1 ===
The specification was written in 1996 in response to EU Council Directive 96/48/EC of 23 July 1996 on interoperability of the trans-European high-speed rail system. First the European Railway Research Institute was instructed to formulate the specification and about the same time the ERTMS User Group was formed from six railway operators that took the lead role in the specification. The standardisation went on for the next two years and was felt to be slow by some industry partners. 1998 saw the formation of Union of Signalling Industry (UNISIG), including Alstom, Ansaldo, Bombardier, Invensys, Siemens and Thales that were to take over the finalisation of the standard.

In July 1998, SRS 5a documents were published that formed the first baseline for technical specifications. UNISIG provided for corrections and enhancements of the baseline specification leading to the Class P specification in April 1999. This baseline specification has been tested by six railways since 1999 as part of the ERTMS.

=== Baseline 2 ===
The railway companies defined some extended requirements that were included in ETCS (e.g., RBC-Handover and track profile information), leading to the Class 1 SRS 2.0.0 specification of ETCS, published in April 2000. Further specification continued through a number of drafts until UNISIG published the SUBSET-026 defining the current implementation of ETCS signalling equipment. This Class 1 SRS 2.2.2 was accepted by the European Commission in decision 2002/731/EC as mandatory for high-speed rail and in directive 2004/50/EC as mandatory for conventional rail. The SUBSET-026 is defined in eight chapters where chapter seven defines the ETCS language and chapter eight describes the balise telegram structure of ETCS Level 1. Later UNISIG published the corrections as SUBSET-108 (known as Class 1 SRS 2.2.2 "+"), that was accepted in decision 2006/679/EC.

The earlier ETCS specification contained many optional elements that limited interoperability. The Class 1 specifications were revised in the following year, leading to the SRS 2.3.0 document series that was made mandatory by the European Commission in Decision 2007/153/EEC on 9 March 2007. Annex A describes the technical specifications on interoperability for high-speed (HS) and conventional rail (CR) transport. Using SRS 2.3.0 a number of railway operators started to deploy ETCS on a large scale, for example the Italian Sistema Controllo Marcia Treno (SCMT) is based on Level 1 balises. Further development concentrated on compatibility specification with the earlier Class B systems, leading to specifications like EuroZUB that continued to use the national rail management on top of Eurobalises for a transitional period. Following the experience in railway operation, the European Union Agency for Railways (ERA) published a revised specification Class 1 SRS 2.3.0d ("debugged") that was accepted by the European Commission in Decision 2008/386/EC on 23 April 2008.

This compilation SRS 2.3.0d was declared final (later called Baseline 2) in this series. There were a list of unresolved functional requests and a need for stability in practical rollouts. So the development of Baseline 3 series started in parallel to incorporate open requests, strip off unneeded material and combine it with solutions found for Baseline 2. The structure of functional levels was continued.

=== Baseline 3 ===
While some countries switched to ETCS with some benefit, German and French railway operators had already introduced modern types of train protection systems and so would gain no benefit. Instead, ideas were introduced on new modes like "Limited Supervision" (known at least since 2004) that would allow for

- a low-cost variant,
- a new and superior model for braking curves,
- a cold movement optimisation and
- additional track description options.

These ideas were compiled into a "Baseline 3" series by the ERA and published as a Class 1 SRS 3.0.0 proposal on 23 December 2008. The first consolidation SRS 3.1.0 of the proposal was published by ERA on 26 February 2010 and the second consolidation SRS 3.2.0 on 11 January 2011. The specification GSM-R Baseline 0 was published as Annex A to the Baseline 3 proposal on 17 April 2012. At the same time a change to Annex A of SRS 2.3.0d was proposed to the European Commission that includes GSM-R Baseline 0 allowing ETCS SRS 3.3.0 trains to run on SRS 2.3.0d tracks. The Baseline 3 proposal was accepted by the European Commission with decision 2012/88/EU on 25 January 2012. The update for SRS 3.3.0 and the extension for SRS 2.3.0d were accepted by the European Commission with decision 2012/696/EU on 6 November 2012.

The ERA work programme concentrated on the refinement of the test specification SRS 3.3.0 that was to be published in July 2013. In parallel the GSM-R specification was to be extended into a GSM-R Baseline 1 until the end of 2013. The German Deutsche Bahn since announced equipping at least the TEN Corridors running on older tracks to be using either Level 1 Limited Supervision or Level 2 on high-speed sections. Work continued on Level 3 definition with low-cost specifications (compare ERTMS Regional) and the integration of GPRS into the radio protocol to increase the signalling bandwidth as required in shunting stations. The specifications for ETCS Baseline 3 and GSM-R Baseline 0 (Baseline 3 Maintenance Release 1) were published as recommendations SRS 3.4.0 by the ERA in May 2014 for submission to the Railway Interoperability and Safety Committee (RISC) in a meeting in June 2014. The SRS 3.4.0 was accepted by the European Commission with the amending decision 2015/14/EU on 5 January 2015.

Stakeholders such as Deutsche Bahn have opted for a streamlined development model for ETCS. DB will assemble a database of change requests (CRs) to be assembled by priority and effect in a CR-list for the next milestone report (MRs) that shall be published on fixed dates through ERA. The SRS 3.4.0 from Q2 2014 matches with the MR1 from this process. Further steps were planned for the MR2 to be published in Q4 2015 (that became the SRS 3.5.0) and the MR3 to be published in Q3 2017 (whereas SRS 3.6.0 was settled earlier in June 2016). Each specification will be commented on and handed over to the RISC for subsequent legalization in the European Union. Deutsche Bahn has expressed a commitment to keep the Baseline 3 specification backward compatible starting at least with SRS 3.5.0 that is due in 2015 according to the streamlined MR2 process, with the MR1 adding requirements from its tests in preparation for the switch to ETCS (for example better frequency filters for the GSM-R radio equipment). The intention is based on plans to start replacing its PZB train protection system at the time.

In December 2015, the ERA published the Baseline 3 Release 2 (B3R2) series including GSM-R Baseline 1. The B3R2 is not an update to the previous Baseline 3 Maintenance Release 1 (B3MR1). The notable change is the inclusion of EGPRS (GPRS with mandatory EDGE support) in the GSM-R specification, corresponding to the new Eirene FRS 8 / SRS 16 specifications. Additionally B3R2 includes the ETCS Driver Machine Interface and the SRS 3.5.0. This Baseline 3 series was accepted by European Commission with decisions 2016/919/EC in late May 2016. The decision references ETCS SRS 3.6.0 that was subsequently published by the ERA in a Set 3 in June 2016. The publications of the European Commission and ERA for SRS 3.6.0 were synchronized to the same day, 15 June. The Set 3 of B3R2 is marked as the stable basis for subsequent ERTMS deployments in the EU.

The name of Set 3 follows the style of publications of the decisions of the European Commission where updates to the Baseline 2 and Baseline 3 specifications were accepted at the same time. For example decision 2015/14/EU of January 2015 has two tables "Set of specifications # 1 (ETCS Baseline 2 and GSM-R baseline 0)" and "Set of specifications # 2 (ETCS Baseline 3 and GSM-R Baseline 0)". In the decision of May 2016 there are three tables: "Set of specifications # 1 (ETCS Baseline 2 and GSM-R Baseline 1)", "Set of specifications # 2 (ETCS Baseline 3 Maintenance Release 1 and GSM-R Baseline 1)", and "Set of specifications # 3 (ETCS Baseline 3 Release 2 and GSM-R Baseline 1)". In that decision the SRS (System Requirement Specification) and DMI (ETCS Driver Machine Interface) are kept at 3.4.0 for Set 2 while updating Set 3 to SRS and DMI 3.6.0. All three of the tables (Set 1, Set 2 and Set 3) are updated to include the latest EIRENE FRS 8.0.0 including the same GSM-R SRS 16.0.0 to ensure interoperability. In that decision the SRS is kept at 2.3.0 for Set 1 – and the decision of 2012/88/EU was repealed that was first introducing the interoperability of Set 1 and Set 2 (with SRS 3.3.0 at the time) based on GSM-R Baseline 0.

Introduction of Baseline 3 on railways requires installation of it on board, which requires re-certification of trains. This will cost less than first ETCS certification, but still at least €100k per vehicle. This makes Baseline 3 essentially a new incompatible ETCS which requires replacement of electronic equipment and software onboard and along the track when installing. Trains with ETCS Baseline 3 are allowed to go on railways with Baseline 2 if certified for it, so railways with ETCS do not have an urgent need to change systems.

The first live tests of Baseline 3 took place in Denmark in July 2016. Denmark wants to install ERTMS on all its railways, and then use Baseline 3.

British freight and passenger operators have signed contracts to install Baseline 3 in their trains, the first around 2020.

=== Baseline 4 ===
ETCS Baseline 4 was published on 8 September 2023 by the European Union, together with the ATO Baseline 1, RMR: GSM-R B1 MR1 and FRMCS Baseline 0.

The European Union Agency for Railways will prepare a report to the commission by 1 January 2025 on the availability of ETCS on-board products compliant with ETCS Baseline 4 and ATO Baseline 1, and on the availability of FRMCS on-board prototypes.

=== Deployment planning ===
The development of ETCS has matured to a point that cross-border traffic is possible and some countries have announced a date for the end of older systems. The first contract to run the full length of a cross-border railway was signed by Germany and France in 2004 on the high-speed line from Paris to Frankfurt, including LGV Est. The connection opened in 2007 using ICE3MF, to be operational with ETCS trains by 2016. The Netherlands, Germany, Switzerland and Italy have a commitment to open Corridor A from Rotterdam to Genoa for freight by the start of 2015. Non-European countries also are starting to deploy ERTMS/ETCS, including Algeria, China, India, Israel, Kazakhstan, Korea, Mexico, New Zealand, and Saudi Arabia. Australia would switch to ETCS on some dedicated lines starting in 2013.

The European Commission has mandated that European railways to publish their deployment planning up to 5 July 2017. This will be used to create a geographical and technical database (TENtec) that can show the ETCS deployment status on the Trans-European Network. From the comparative overview the commission wants to identify the needs for additional coordination measures to support the implementation. Synchronous with the publication of ETCS SRS 3.6.0 on 15 June 2017 the Regulation 2016/796/EC was published. It mandates the replacement of the European Railways Agency by the European Union Agency for Railways. The agency was tasked with the creation of a regulatory framework for a Single European Railway Area (SERA) in the 4th Railway Package to be resolved in late June 2016. A week later the new EU Agency for Railways emphasized the stability of B3R2 and the usage as the foundation for oncoming ETCS implementations in the EU. Based on projections in the Rhine-Alps-Corridor, a break-even of the cross-border ETCS implementation is expected in the early 2030s. A new memorandum of understanding was signed on InnoTrans in September 2016 for a completion of the first ETCS Deployment Plan targets by 2022. The new planning was accepted by the European Commission in January 2017 with a goal to have 50% of the Core Network Corridors equipped by 2023 and the remainder in a second phase up to 2030.

The costs for the switch to ETCS are well documented in the Swiss reports from their railway operator SBB to the railway authority BAV. In December 2016 it was shown that they could start switching parts of the system to ETCS Level 2 whenever a section needs improvement. This would not only result in a network where sections of ETCS and the older ZUB would switch back and forth along lines, but the full transition to ETCS would last until 2060 and its cost were estimated at 9.5 billion Swiss Franc (US$ 10.4 billion). The expected advantages of ETCS for more security and up to 30% more throughput would also be at stake. Thus legislation favours the second option where the internal equipment of interlocking stations would be replaced by new electronic ETCS desks before switching the network to ETCS Level 2. However the current railway equipment manufacturers did not provide enough technology options at the time of the report to start it off. So the plan would be to run feasibility studies until 2019 with a projected start of changeover set to 2025. A rough estimate indicates that the switch to ETCS Level 2 could be completed within 13 years from that point and it would cost about 6.1 billion Swiss Franc (US$ 6.7 billion). For comparison, SBB indicated that the maintenance of lineside signals would also cost about 6.5 billion Swiss Franc (US$ 7.14 billion) which however can be razed once Level 2 is effective.

The Swiss findings influenced the German project "Digitale Schiene" (digital rail). It is estimated that 80% of the rail network can be operated by GSM-R without lineside signals. This will bring about 20% more trains that can be operated in the country. The project was unveiled in January 2018 and it will start off with a feasibility study on electronic interlocking stations that should show a transition plan by mid 2018. It is expected that 80% of the network will have been rebuilt to the radio-controlled system by 2030. This is more extensive than earlier plans which focused more on ETCS Level 1 with Limited Supervision instead of Level 2.

=== Alternative implementations ===
The ETCS standard has listed a number of older Automatic Train Controls (ATC) as Class B systems. While they are set to obsolescence, the older line side signal information can be read by using Specific Transmission Modules (STM) hardware and fed the Class B signal information to a new ETCS onboard safety control system for partial supervision. In practice, an alternative transition scheme is sometimes used where an older ATC is rebased to use Eurobalises. This leverages the fact that a Eurobalise can transmit multiple information packets and the reserved national datagram (packet number 44) can encode the signal values from the old system in parallel with ETCS datagram packets. The older train-born ATC system is equipped with an additional Eurobalise reader that converts the datagram signals. This allows for a longer transitional period where the old ATC and Eurobalises are attached on the sleepers until all trains have a Eurobalise reader. The newer ETCS-compliant trains can be switched to an ETCS operation scheme by a software update of the onboard train computer.

In Switzerland, a replacement of the older Integra-Signum magnets and ZUB 121 magnets to Eurobalises in the Euro-Signum plus EuroZUB operation scheme is under way. All trains had been equipped with Eurobalise readers and signal converters until 2005 (generally called "Rucksack" "backpack"). The general operation scheme will be switched to ETCS by 2017 with an allowance for older trains to run on specific lines with EuroZUB until 2025.

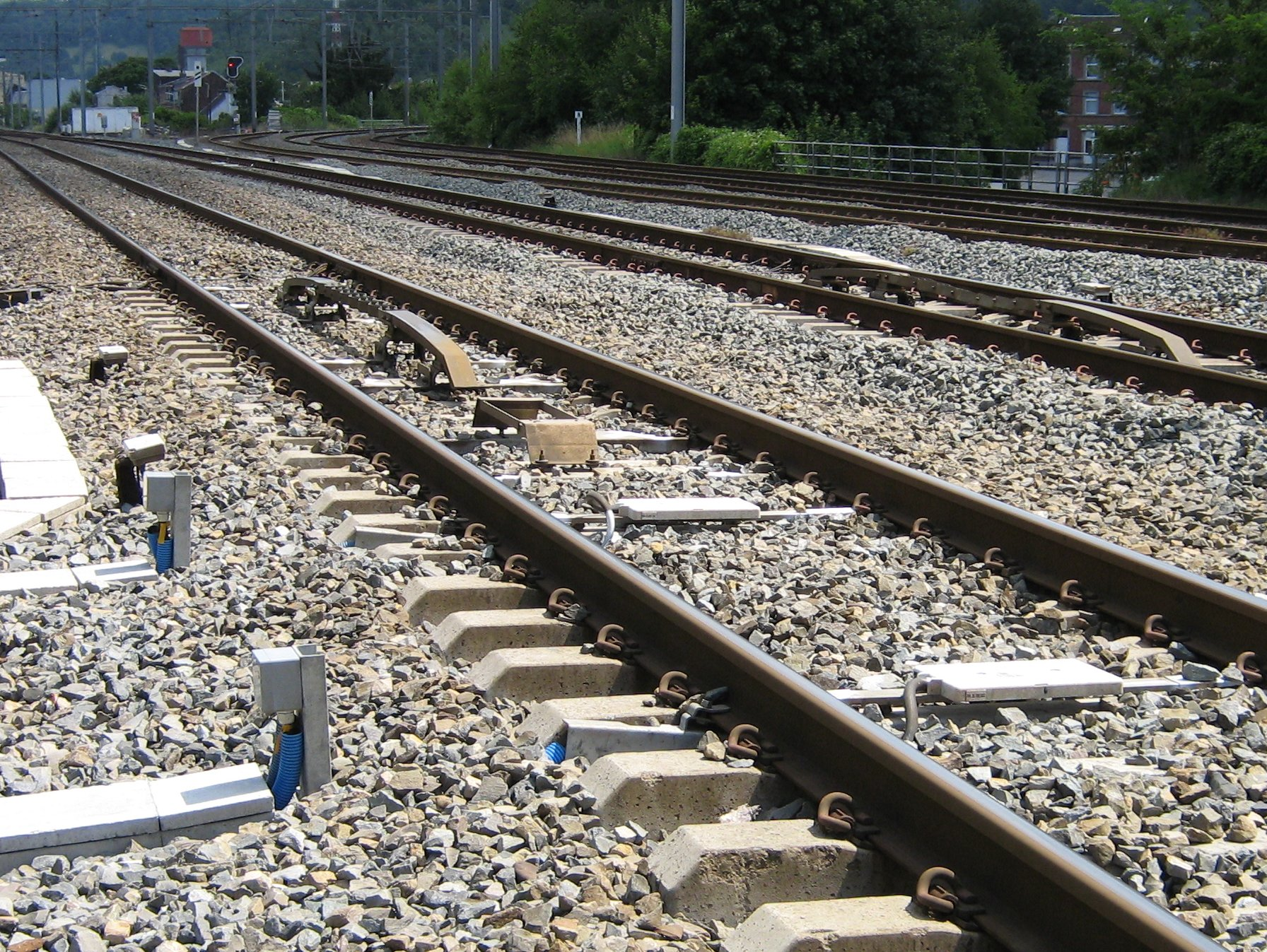
Croco + TBL + ETCS balises at the same signal in Belgium

In Belgium, the TBL 1 crocodiles were complemented with Eurobalises in the TBL 1+ operation scheme. The TBL 1+ definition allowed for an additional speed restriction to be transmitted to the train computer already. Likewise in Luxembourg the Memor II (using crocodiles) was extended into a Memor II+ operation scheme.

In Berlin, the old mechanical train stops on the local S-Bahn rapid transit system are replaced by Eurobalises in the newer ZBS train control system. Unlike the other systems it is not meant to be transitional for a later ETCS operation scheme. The signalling centres and the train computer use ETCS components with a specific software version. Manufacturers like Siemens point out that their ETCS systems can be switched for operating on ETCS, TBL, or ZBS lines.

The Wuppertal Suspension Railway called for bids on a modernization of its train protection and management system. Alstom won the tender with a plan largely composed of ETCS components. Instead of GSM-R the system uses TETRA which had been in use already for voice communication. The TETRA system will be expanded to allow movement authority being signaled by digital radio. Because train integrity will not be checked, the solution was called as ETCS Level 2+ by the manufacturer. Train integrity is the level of belief in the train being complete and not having left coaches or wagons behind. The usage of moving blocks was dropped however while the system was implemented with just 256 balises checking the odometry of the trains that signal their position by radio to the ETCS control center. It is expected that headways will drop from 3.5 minutes to 2 minutes when the system is activated. The system was inaugurated on 1 September 2019.

== Levels of ETCS ==
ETCS is specified at four numbered levels.
| Level | Description |
|---|---|
| 0 | ETCS-compliant locomotives or rolling stock do not interact with lineside equipment, e.g. because of missing ETCS compliance. |
| NTC (former STM) | ETCS-compliant driving cars are equipped with additional Specific Transmission Modules (STM) for interaction with legacy signalling systems. Inside the cabs are standardised ETCS driver interfaces. With Baseline 3 definitions it is called National Train Control. |
| 1 | ETCS is installed at lineside (possibly superimposed with legacy systems) and on board; spot transmission of data from track to train (and versa) via Eurobalises or Euroloops. |
| 2 | As Level 1, but Eurobalises are only used for the exact train position detection. The continuous data transmission via GSM-R with the Radio Block Center (RBC) give the required signalling information to the driver's display. There is further lineside equipment needed, i.e. for train integrity detection. |
| 3 | As Level 2, but train location and train integrity supervision no longer rely on trackside equipment such as track circuits or axle counters. Note that Levels 2 and 3 have been merged as an extended Level 2 in CCS TSI 2023. |

=== Level 0 ===
Level 0 applies when an ETCS-fitted vehicle is used on a non-ETCS route. The trainboard equipment monitors the maximum speed of that type of train. The train driver observes the trackside signals. Since signals can have different meanings on different railways, this level places additional requirements on drivers' training. If the train has left a higher-level ETCS, it might be limited in speed globally by the last balises encountered.

=== Level 1 ===
ETCS Level 1 schematic

Level 1 is a cab signalling system that can be superimposed on the existing signalling system, leaving the fixed signalling system (national signalling and track-release system) in place. Eurobalise radio beacons pick up signal aspects from the trackside signals via signal adapters and telegram coders (Lineside Electronics Unit – LEU) and transmit them to the vehicle as a movement authority together with route data at fixed points. The on-board computer continuously monitors and calculates the maximum speed and the braking curve from this data. Because of the spot transmission of data, the train must travel over the Eurobalise beacon to obtain the next movement authority. In order for a stopped train to be able to move (when the train is not stopped exactly over a balise), there are optical signals that show permission to proceed. With the installation of additional Eurobalises ("infill balises") or a EuroLoop between the distant signal and main signal, the new proceed aspect is transmitted continuously. The EuroLoop is an extension of the Eurobalise over a particular distance that basically allows data to be transmitted continuously to the vehicle over cables emitting electromagnetic waves. A radio version of the EuroLoop is also possible.

For example, in Norway and Sweden the meanings of single green and double green are contradictory. Drivers have to know the difference (already with traditional systems) to drive beyond the national borders safely. In Sweden, the ETCS Level 1 list of signal aspects are not fully included in the traditional list, so there is a special marking saying that such signals have slightly different meanings. (Note: The City Tunnel (Malmö) has ETCS Level 1 signals as a preparation for ETCS Level 1 installation)

==== Limited Supervision ====
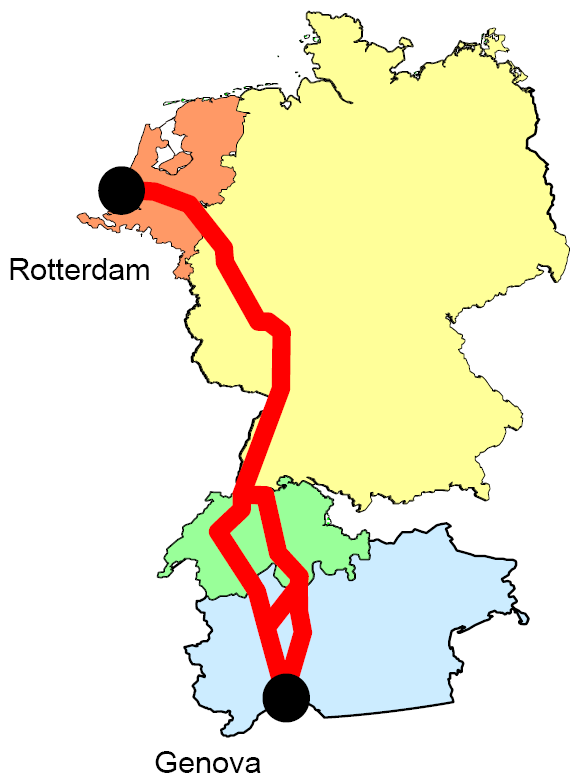
The ETCS Corridor A will mostly be using Level 1 Limited Supervision. (Outdated for Germany, the Level will be mostly Level 2, only some bordertracks will be Level 1 LS.)

Whereas ETCS L1 Full Supervision requires supervision to be provided at every signal, ETCS L1 Limited Supervision allows for only a part of the signals to be included, thus allowing to tailor the installation of equipment, only to points of the network where the increase in functionality justifies the cost. Formally, this is possible for all ETCS levels, but it is currently only applied with Level 1. As supervision is not provided at every signal, this implies that cab signalling is not available and the driver must still look out for trackside signals. For this reason, the level of safety is not as high, as not all signals are included and there is still reliance on the driver seeing and respecting the trackside signalling.

Limited Supervision mode was proposed by RFF/SNCF (France) based on a proposal by SBB (Switzerland). Several years later a steering group was announced in spring 2004. After the UIC workshop on 30 June 2004 it was agreed that UIC should produce a FRS document as the first step. The resulting proposal was distributed to the eight administrations that were identified: ÖBB (Austria), SNCB/NMBS (Belgium), BDK (Denmark), DB Netze (Germany), RFI (Italy), CFR (Romania), Network Rail (UK) and SBB (Switzerland). After 2004 German Deutsche Bahn took over the responsibility for the change request.

In Switzerland the Federal Office of Transport (BAV) announced in August 2011 that beginning with 2018 the Eurobalise-based EuroZUB/EuroSignum signalling will be switched to Level 1 Limited Supervision. High-speed lines are already using ETCS Level 2. The north–south corridor should be switched to ETCS by 2015 according to international contracts regarding the TEN-T Corridor-A from Rotterdam to Genova (European backbone). But it is delayed and will be used with December 2017 timetable change.

=== Level 2 ===
ETCS Level 2 schematic

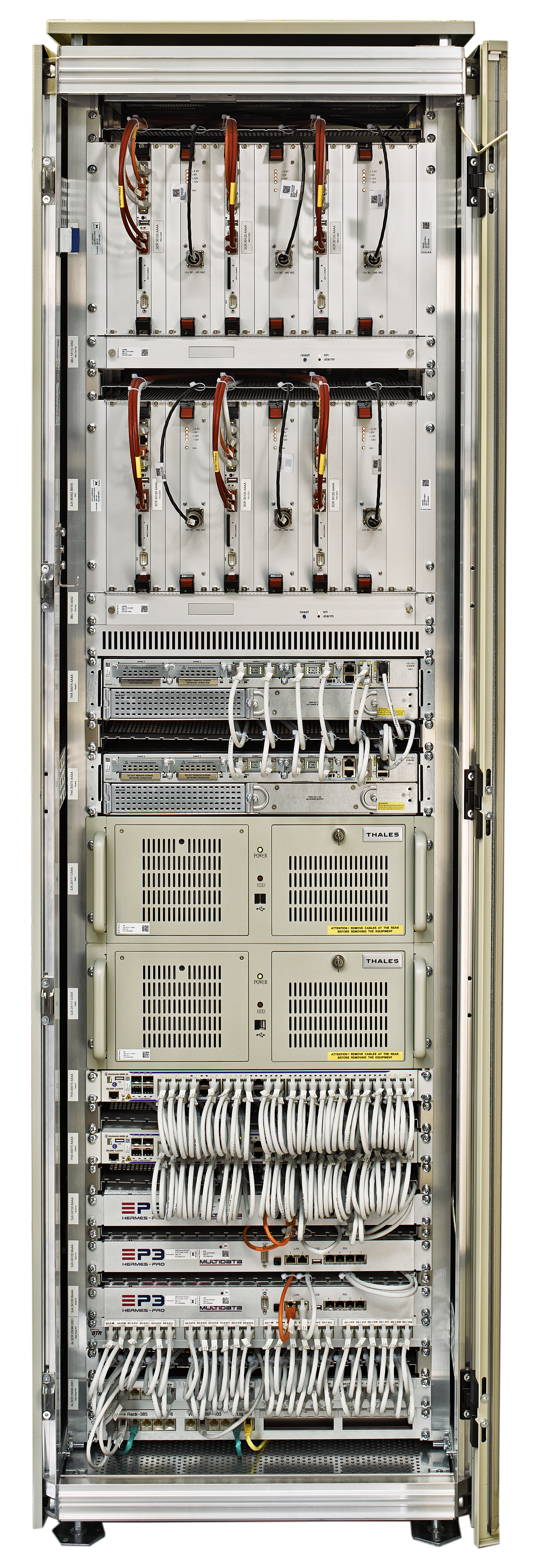
Radio Block Centre (RBC)

Level 2 is a digital radio-based system. Movement authority and other signal aspects are displayed in the cab for the driver. Apart from a few indicator panels, it is therefore possible to dispense with trackside signalling. However, the train detection and the train integrity supervision still remain in place at the trackside. Train movements are monitored continually by the radio block centre using this trackside-derived information. The movement authority is transmitted to the vehicle continuously via GSM-R or GPRS together with speed information and route data. The Eurobalises are used at this level as passive positioning beacons or "electronic milestones". Between two positioning beacons, the train determines its position via sensors (axle transducers, accelerometer and radar). The positioning beacons are used in this case as reference points for correcting distance measurement errors. The on-board computer continuously monitors the transferred data and the maximum permissible speed.

=== Level 3 ===
ETCS Level 3 schematic

Note, as of the publishing of Regulation 2023/1695 on 10 August 2023, the Level 3 functionality is now merged into Level 2 as an option in case the train is able to provide the necessary information regarding its integrity.

With Level 3, ETCS goes beyond pure train protection functionality with the implementation of full radio-based train spacing. Fixed train detection devices (GFM) are no longer required. As with Level 2, trains find their position themselves by means of positioning beacons and via sensors (axle transducers, accelerometer and radar) and must also be capable of determining train integrity on board to the very highest degree of reliability. By transmitting the positioning signal to the radio block centre, it is always possible to determine that point on the route the train has safely cleared. The following train can already be granted another movement authority up to this point. The route is thus no longer cleared in fixed track sections. In this respect, Level 3 departs from classic operation with fixed intervals: given sufficiently short positioning intervals, continuous line-clear authorisation is achieved and train headways come close to the principle of operation with absolute braking distance spacing ("moving block"). Level 3 uses radio to pass movement authorities to the train. Level 3 uses train reported position and integrity to determine if it is safe to issue the movement authority. Solutions for reliable train integrity supervision are highly complex and are hardly suitable for transfer to older models of freight rolling stock. The Confirmed Safe Rear End (CSRE) is the point in rear of the train at the furthest extent of the safety margin. If the Safety margin is zero, the CSRE aligns with the Confirmed Rear End. Some kind of end-of-train device is needed or special lines for rolling stock with included integrity checks like commuter multiple units or high speed passenger trains. A ghost train is a vehicle in the Level 3 Area that are not known to the Level 3 Track-side.

==== ERTMS Regional ====
A variant of Level 3 is ERTMS Regional, which has the option to be used with virtual fixed blocks or with true moving block signalling. It was early defined and implemented in a cost sensitive environment in Sweden. In 2016 with SRS 3.5+ it was adopted by core standards and is now officially part of Baseline 3 Level 3.

It is possible to use train integrity supervision, or by accepting limited speed and traffic volume to lessen the effect and probability of colliding with detached rail vehicles. ERTMS Regional has lower commissioning and maintenance costs, since trackside train detection devices are not routinely used, and is suitable for lines with low traffic volume. These low-density lines usually have no automatic train protection system today, and thus will benefit from the added safety.

This system was put into operation in 2012 on one railway in Sweden, however without passenger traffic. It is still in operation there (as of 2022), but has not been put into operation on any other railway, since more development and higher requirement on installation is needed to fulfil the high ETCS safety standards, causing much higher cost than originally anticipated. So the targeted railways in general keep their manual signalling.

==== ETCS Hybrid Train Detection (formerly known as ETCS Hybrid Level 3) ====
ETCS Hybrid Train Detection is under development. The last published reference by EEIG introduced "Joining two trains" as additional feature. This additional functionality will pave the way to live shunting in Virtual Coupling which will enhance Train Convoys (platooning) principles. The basic setup is like Level 2 with fixed blocks supervised by trackside train detection systems. But for approved trains, there can be much shorter virtual blocks, "Virtual Sub-Sections", which allow such trains to go more dense, without having so many expensive and fault prone trackside detection systems. These trains, mainly passenger trains, must have their own train integrity supervision and other requirements like known train length, and software for Hybrid Train Detection. Only one non-approved train allowed per Level 2 block at each time, which make traditional freight trains possible, but consuming more capacity. For metros, CBTC is a system in operation using similar ideas. ETCS Hybrid was deployed in real traffic for the first time on the Delhi–Meerut railway in India in October 2023.

==== GNSS ====
Instead of using fixed balises to detect train location there may be "virtual balises" based on satellite navigation and GNSS augmentation. Several studies about the usage of GNSS in railway signalling solutions have been researched by the UIC (GADEROS/GEORAIL) and ESA (RUNE/INTEGRAIL). Experiences in the LOCOPROL project show that real balises are still required in railway stations, junctions, and other areas where greater positional accuracy is required. The successful usage of satellite navigation in the GLONASS-based Russian ABTC-M block control has triggered the creation of the ITARUS-ATC system that integrates Level 2 RBC elements – the manufacturers Ansaldo STS and VNIIAS aim for certification of the ETCS compatibility of this system.

The first real implementation of the virtual balise concept has been done during the ESA project 3InSat on 50 km of track of the Cagliari–Golfo Aranci Marittima railway on Sardinia in which a SIL-4 train localisation at signalling system level has been developed using differential GPS.

There is a pilot project "ERSAT EAV" running since 2015 with the objective to verify the suitability of EGNSS as the enabler of cost-efficient and economically sustainable ERTMS signalling solutions for safety railway applications.

Ansaldo STS has come to lead the UNISIG working group on GNSS integration into ERTMS within Next Generation Train Control (NGTC) WP7, whose main scope is to specify ETCS virtual balise functionality, taking into account the interoperability requirement. Following the NGTC specifications the future interoperable GNSS positioning systems, supplied by different manufacturers, will reach the defined positioning performance in the locations of the virtual balises.

=== Level 4 ===
Level 4 is an idea that has been mooted that envisages Train Convoys or Virtual Coupling as ways to increase track capacity, it is merely for discussion at the moment.

== Train-borne equipment ==
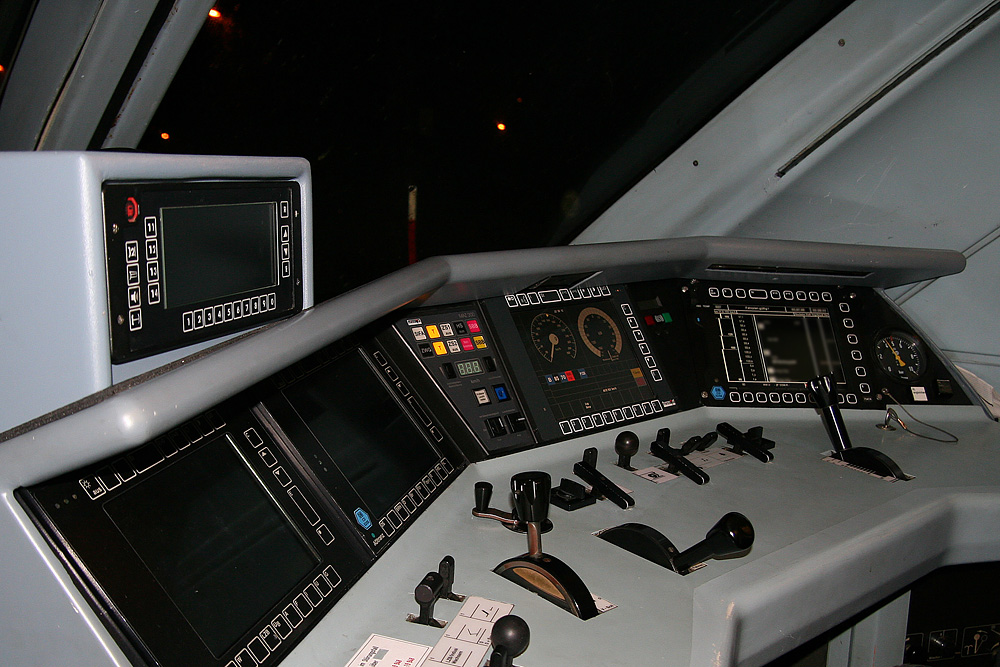
A driver's cab with an ETCS Driver-Machine Interface amongst other instruments and displays

Operation under ETCS requires that each train be fitted with a number of interlinked on-board systems that monitor the position and the status of the train, and that allow the driver to receive Movement Authorities and interact with the ETCS system. The equipment must be certified by the appropriate Notified Bodies.

=== Driver Machine Interface ===
The Driver-Machine Interface (DMI), formerly "Man-Machine Interface" (MMI), is the standardised interface for the driver. It consists of a set of colour displays that show the train's speed, the ETCS Movement Authority (where relevant), and other information about the status of the ETCS equipment. In many applications, it is also used to display train control information sourced from pre-ETCS (NTC, national train control) signalling and train protection systems when the train is not under ETCS control. Some operators prefer to keep the NTC driver interface separate in order not to be reliant on portions of the ETCS installation, but in vehicles designed for international operation the provision of separate driver interfaces leads to a cluttered desk, which is ergonomically undesirable. To allow access to setup and configuration menus and for inputs from the driver such as acknowledgment of Level transitions, the DMI is provided with either a touchscreen or an array of soft keys. The DMI may be implemented using two display panel modules in a redundant configuration, so that in the event of one panel failing the other may show a compact display of essential indications. Changeover between panels in this case may be manual or automatic, according to the supplier's implementation. In practice, however, displays are found to be long-lasting and reliable.

=== Balise Transmission Module ===
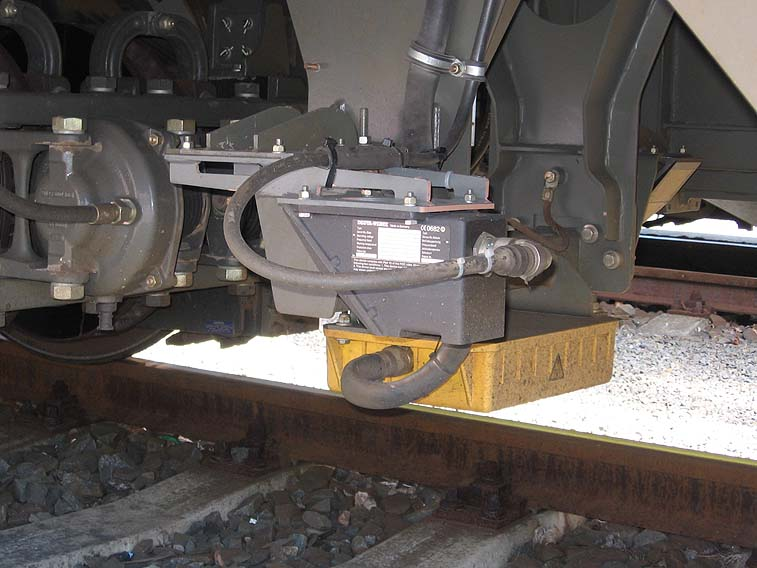
A Balise Transmission Module (yellow) and a DeutaWerke doppler radar unit mounted on the underside of a railway vehicle

The Balise Transmission Module (BTM) is a wireless transceiver that facilitates the traffic of data telegrams between the train and the Eurobalises mounted on the track. Associated with the BTM is the antenna unit for tele-powering the balises and uplink data transmission. The BTM electronics may be incorporated into the antenna unit, but most suppliers divide the BTM and implement it as a module within the EVC or as a separate unit.

=== Odometric sensors ===
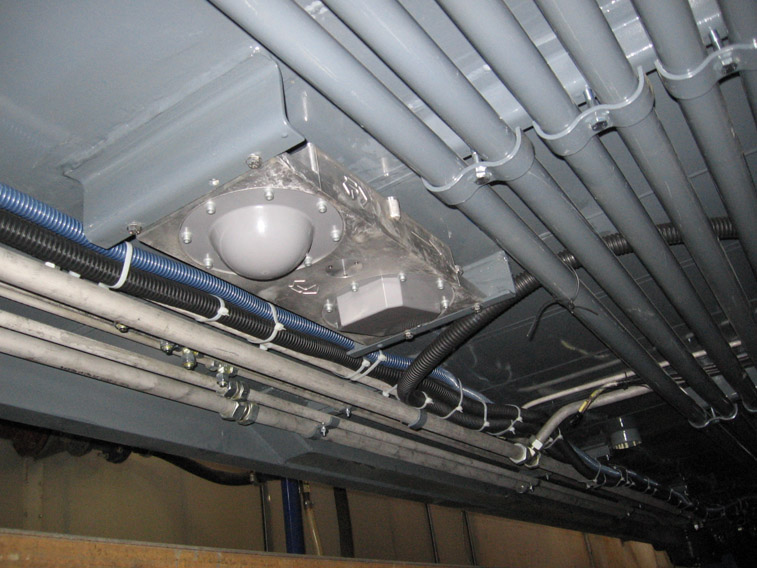
A Doppler radar odometry system mounted on the underside of a railway vehicle

The odometric sensors allow the train to determine the distance it has travelled along the track since it last passed a Eurobalise or other known fixed position, which is necessary for the train's ETCS controller to ensure that the train does not proceed past the end of its Movement Authority. A number of different technologies are applied for this purpose, including rotation counters mounted on one or more of the train's axles, accelerometers, and Doppler radar.

=== European Vital Computer ===
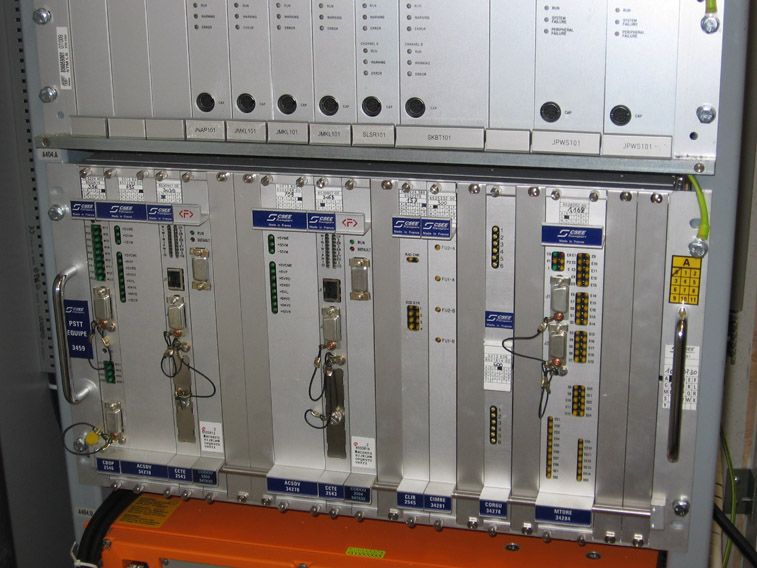
A rack-mounted European Vital Computer system

The European Vital Computer (EVC), sometimes referred to as Eurocab, is the heart of train's on-board ETCS equipment. It receives and processes the information received from the train's sensors and communications equipment, sends the display image to the DMI, monitors the train's compliance with Movement Authorities and other operational constraints, and intervenes if necessary to ensure safety by making an emergency brake application or otherwise overriding the driver's controls. Because there is an upper limit to length of the cables that connect the EVC to the other ETCS components, longer multiple-unit trains can sometimes require a separate EVC for each driver's cab.

=== Euroradio ===
The Euroradio communication unit is for both voice and data communication. Because in ETCS Level 2 all signalling information is exchanged via GSM-R, the radio equipment is capable of maintaining two simultaneous connections to the ETCS Radio Block Centre.

=== Juridical Recording Unit ===
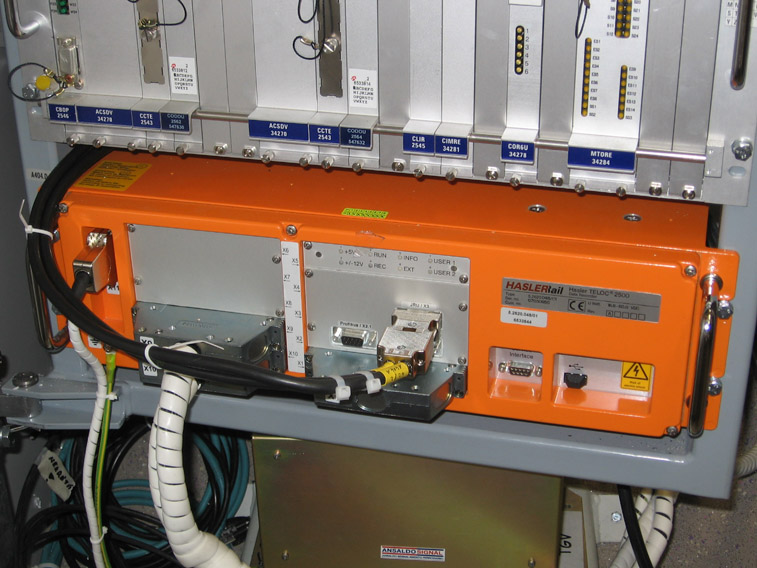
A trainborne data logger, hosting the ETCS Juridical Recording Unit, may also host other functions such as general train data recording, auxiliary speed measurement, the driver vigilance system and national train protection systems

The Juridical Recording Unit (JRU) is an event recorder, usually integrated with the EVC, that logs the actions of the driver and the state of both the signalling and the ETCS equipment itself. It can be considered equivalent to an aircraft's flight recorder.

=== Train Interface Unit ===
The Train Interface Unit (TIU) is the interface between the EVC and the train/locomotive, for submitting commands or receiving information.

=== Specific Transmission Modules ===
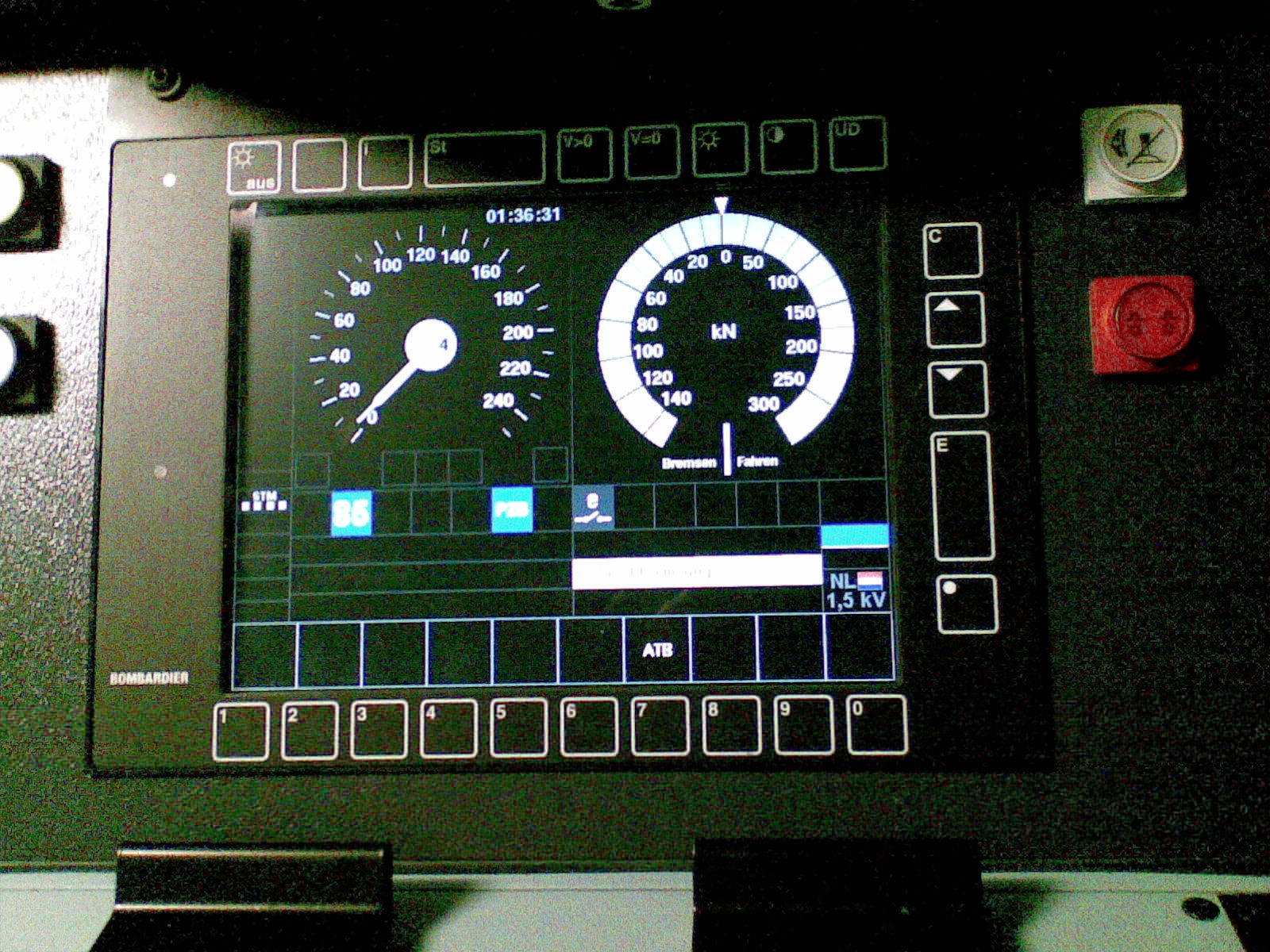
A DMI operating in STM mode for PZB, a German Class B system

A Specific Transmission Module (STM) is a special interface for the EVC that enables operation with one or more national Class B ATP systems, such as PZB, MEMOR, EBICab700/CONVEL, or ATB. It consists of the hardware needed to link the specific sensors and receivers that pick up on-track and lineside signals from the legacy installation with the EVC, and the software that allows the EVC to emulate the processing functions that would be performed by the legacy system controller on a non-ETCS train. The information provided by the legacy system is then shown to the driver via the DMI. It is possible to fit an EVC with STMs for multiple legacy systems, as required. In SRS versions up to 2.3.0d, the associated ETCS operational level was called Level STM. From SRS version 3.0.0, it is known as Level NTC, for "national train control"; this is because in many vehicles the national system is implemented using conventional equipment with a proprietary interface to the EVC, instead of using an STM compliant with the fit, form and function interfaces specified in the SRS.

== Lineside equipment ==
Lineside equipment is the fixed installed part of ETCS installation. According to ETCS Levels the rail related part of installation is decreasing. While in Level 1 sequences with two or more of eurobalises are needed for signal exchange, in Level 2 balises are used for milestone application only. It is replaced in Level 2 by mobile communication and more sophisticated software. In Level 3 even less fixed installation is used. In 2017 first positive tests for satellite positioning were done.

=== Eurobalise ===
The Eurobalise is a passive or active antenna device mounted on rail sleepers. Mostly it transmits information to the driving vehicle. It can be arranged in groups to transfer information. There are Fixed and Transparent Data Balises. Transparent Data Balises are sending changing information from LEU to the trains, e.g. signal indications. Fixed Balises are programmed for a special information like gradients and speed restrictions.

=== Euroloop ===
The Euroloop is an extension for Eurobalises in ETCS Level 1. It is a special leaky feeder for transmitting information telegrams to the car.

=== Lineside Electronic Unit ===
The Lineside Electronic Unit (LEU) is the connecting unit between the Transparent Data Balises with signals or Signalling control in ETCS Level 1.

=== Radio Block Centre ===
A Radio Block Centre is a specialised computing device with specification safety integrity level 4 (SIL) for generating Movement Authorities (MA) and transmitting it to trains. It gets information from signalling control and from the trains in its section. It hosts the specific geographic data of the railway section and receives cryptographic keys from trains passing in. According to conditions the RBC will attend the trains with MA until leaving the section. RBC have defined interfaces to trains, but have no regulated interfaces to Signalling Control and only have national regulation.

== Operation modes in ETCS ==
Modes during a cab change under ETCS Level 2

Screenshot of the Driver Machine Interface of ETCS, highlighting the areas of the display

| Abbreviation and DMI symbol | Full name | Used in level | Description |
|---|---|---|---|
| FS | Full Supervision | 1, 2, 3 | The locomotive pulls the train, ETCS has all required information |
| LS | Limited Supervision | 1, 2, 3 | This mode is new to SRS 3.0.0 |
| OS | On Sight | 1, 2, 3 | On-sight ride |
| SR | Staff Responsible | 1, 2, 3 | The driver was granted permission to pass faulty signals |
| SH | Shunting | 0, 1, 2, 3 | |
| PS (no symbol) | Passive Shunting | 0, NTC, 1, 2, 3 | This mode is new to SRS 3.0.0 |
| UN | Unfitted | 0 | The line is not fitted with ETCS: the system will only observe master speed limit and train protection is left to older systems |
| SL (no symbol) | Sleeping | 0, NTC, 1, 2, 3 | Second locomotive controlled from the leading one |
| SB | Stand By | 0, NTC, 1, 2, 3 | |
| TR | Trip | NTC, 1, 2, 3 | |
| PT | Post Trip | 1, 2, 3 | The train overpassed the order to stop, full braking will be executed |
| SF | System Failure | 0, NTC, 1, 2, 3 | Trainborne ETCS equipment detected its failure |
| IS (no symbol) | Isolation | 0, NTC, 1, 2, 3 | Driver disconnected ETCS |
| NP (no symbol) | No Power | 0, NTC, 1, 2, 3 | |
| NL | Non Leading | 0, NTC, 1, 2, 3 | Second locomotive with its own driver |
| SE (no symbol) | STM European | NTC | This mode has not been implemented by any vendor and was removed by SRS 3.1.0 |
| SN | National System | NTC | |
| RV | Reversing | 1, 2, 3 | |

== ETCS test laboratories ==
To be a reference laboratory ERA is requesting the laboratories to be accredited ISO17025.

Many ETCS test laboratories work together to bring support to the industry, most are members of the ERTMS Accredited Labs (EAL) association which is recognized as a Representative Body:

- Multitel has become accredited ISO17025 for EVC Test (Subset-076 / Subset-094) since 22 February 2011.
- The Laboratoire ERTMS France (France ERTMS Laboratory) of SNCF Voyageurs is accredited ISO 17025 since 2017.

== Future ==
GSM is no longer being developed outside of GSM-R. However, as of 2021, ERA expected GSM-R equipment suppliers to support the technology until at least 2030, however this may be extended further depending upon the availability and validation of a suitable replacement system. ERA is considering what action is needed to smoothly transition to a successor system, with UIC's Future Railway Mobile Communication System (FRMCS) program considering 5G NR. The Baseline 3 of ETCS contains functionality for this.

== Deployment ==
In July 2009, the European Commission announced that ETCS is mandatory for all EU-funded projects that include new or upgraded signalling, and GSM-R is required when radio communications are upgraded. Some short stretches in Spain, Switzerland, Italy, the Netherlands, Germany, France, Sweden, and Belgium are equipped with Level 2 and in operation.

=== ETCS corridors ===
Based on the proposal for 30 TEN-T Priority Axes and Projects during 2003, a cost/benefit analysis was performed by the UIC, presented in December 2003. This identified ten rail corridors covering about 20% of the TEN network that should be given priority in changing to ETCS, and these were included in decision 884/2004/EC by the European Commission.

In 2005 the UIC combined the axes into the following ETCS Corridors, subject to international development contracts:

- Corridor A: Rotterdam – Duisburg – Basel – Genoa
- Corridor B: Naples – Bologna – Innsbruck – Munich – Hamburg (branch from Berlin) – Stockholm
- Corridor C: Antwerp – Strasbourg – Basel/Antwerp – Dijon – Lyon
- Corridor D: Valencia – Barcelona – Lyon – Turin – Milan – Trieste – Ljubljana – Budapest
- Corridor E: Dresden – Prague – Vienna – Budapest – Constanta
- Corridor F: Aachen – Duisburg – Hanover – Magdeburg – Berlin – Poznań – Warsaw – Belarus

The Trans-European Transport Network Executive Agency (TEN-T EA) publishes ETCS funding announcements showing the progress of trackside equipment and onboard equipment installation.

- Corridor A gets trackside equipment January 2007 – December 2012 (2007-DE-60320-P German section Betuweroute – Basel), June 2008 – December 2013 (2007-IT-60360-P Italian section). The Betuweroute in the Netherlands is already using Level 2 and Switzerland will switch to ETCS in 2017.
- Corridor B, January 2007 – December 2012 (2007-AT-60450-P Austrian part), January 2009 – December 2013 (2009-IT-60149-P Italian section Brenner – Verona).
- Corridor C, May 2006 – December 2009 (2006-FR-401c-S LGV-Est).
- Corridor D, January 2009 – December 2013 (2009-EU-60122-P Valencia – Montpellier, Turin – Ljubljana/Murska).
- Corridor E, June 2008 – December 2012 (2007-CZ-60010-P Czech section), May 2009 – December 2013 (2009-AT-60148-P Austrian section via Vienna).
- Corridor F, January 2007 – December 2012 (2007-DE-60080-P Aachen – Duisburg/Oberhausen).

Corridor A has two routes in Germany – the double track east of the Rhine (rechte Rheinstrecke) would be ready with ETCS in 2018 (Emmerich, Oberhausen, Duisburg, Düsseldorf, Köln-Kalk, Neuwied, Oberlahnstein, Wiesbaden, Darmstadt, Mannheim, Schwetzingen, Karlsruhe, Offenburg, Basel), while the upgrade of the double track west of the Rhine (linke Rheinstrecke) would be postponed.

Corridor F would be developed in accordance with Poland as far as it offers ETCS transport: Frankfurt – Berlin – Magdeburg will be ready in 2012, Hanover to Magdeburg – Wittenberg – Görlitz in 2015. At the other end Aachen to Oberhausen will be ready in 2012, the missing section from Oberhausen to Hanover in 2020. The other two corridors are postponed and Germany chooses to support the equipment of locomotives with STMs to fulfill the requirement of ETCS transport on the corridors.

=== Australia ===
- Implementation in Adelaide, South Australia is planned for mid to late 2014.
- Implementation of ETCS Level 2 in South East Queensland is planned to be operational from 2021.
- Planning to trial in the Central Queensland with electric coal trains west of Rockhampton from 2019.
- ETCS L2 will be used for the implementation of Rio Tinto Iron Ore's AutoHaul system, and implemented throughout the majority of their heavy-haul network.
- Implementation of ETCS L1/LS on Sydney Trains and NSW TrainLink's electrified heavy rail suburban lines is being progressively rolled out across the rail network with the northern and southern lines to be operational in 2020. Portions of the electrified network are planned to be equipped with ETCS L2 and ATO; the implementation project is called 'Digital Systems'.
- In the Greater Brisbane region, ETCS is being installed on the Cross River Rail project and the Shorncliffe line, where it is currently being tested. Level 2 testing was completed in July 2022. The first low speed ETCS dynamic test using New Generation Rollingstock was completed in May 2023. Testing continues as of September 2025.

=== Austria ===
Implementation in Austria started in 2001 with a level 1 test section on the Eastern Railway between Vienna and Nickelsdorf. By the end of 2005 the whole line between Vienna and Budapest had been equipped with ETCS L1.

The newly built stretches of the Western Railway between Vienna and St. Pölten and the New Lower Inn Valley Railway are equipped with ETCS L2, as is the North railway from Vienna to Bernhardstal.

As of 2019 a total of 484 km (301 mi) of track uses ETCS.

On the 22 of April 2024 the Austrian Federal Railways (ÖBB) have published their "ETCS expansion plan". As of the publishing date, 616 km have been equipped with ETCS, 461 km of which are L2. The plan foresees 3,300 km of the Austrian railway network being equipped with ETCS by the end of 2038; the implementation devises 20 geo-redundant RBCs for centralised control. The upgrades for the TEN-T Core Network corridors are being prioritised, with their completion being forecasted for the end of 2030. By 2040 the entire network will be operated using ETCS L2 only. An additional challenge being faced by ÖBB is the end-of-life for GSM-R, ÖBB is intending to employ FRMCS in production, starting 2027, while continuously phasing out the older GSM-R; although, there will be a period where both systems are in operation simultaneously. The delay in the standardisation of FRMCS V3 has tightened the time-frame for rollout, all the while GSM-R has kept its date for deprecation, that being 2035.

Furthermore, the entire project is being advertised under the name “TRACK FWD” (spoken: Track Forward). The advertisement claims that the benefits for customers are safety, punctuality, climate action, better service on the countryside and “smarter” maintenance planning, meaning less and shorter times that the tracks are out of order for upkeep.

=== Belgium ===
In Belgium, the state railway company (SNCB in French, in Dutch NMBS, in German NGBE) led all activities for introduction of ETCS since the end of the 1990s. The interest resulted from new High Speed Lines (HSL) under construction, the development of the ports at the Atlantic and technically rotting national signalling systems.

in 1999 the council of SNCB/NMBS decided the opening of HSL 2 with proprietary system TBL 2, but all following lines should use ETCS. To increase the level of security on conventional lines, it was thought to use ETCS L1 for compatibility. But because of high costs for full implementation on rolling stock, it was decided to use standard components from ETCS for interfacing locos (receiver) and rails (beacons) to easily support existing infrastructure. The beacons ("balises") were sending information with reserved national packet type 44, compatible with common signalling. The system was named TBL1+. Later it can be complemented with standardised ETCS information. This was the same migration path as chosen in Italy (SCMT) and Switzerland (Euro-Signum and Euro-ZUB).

In 2003, NMBS/SNCB selected a consortium to supply ETCS for the next high-speed lines with Level 2 and fallback with Level 1.

It was chosen to supply ETCS L1LS first and later migrate to L1FS. So it was started tendering the renewing of 4000 signals with TBL1+ and L1 including support for 20 years in 2001. In 2006 Siemens was selected for delivery.

Following the privatisation of NMBS/SNCB in 2006 a split-off company Infrabel stepped in to be responsible for the whole state railway infrastructure. It continued the introduction of ETCS railway infrastructure, whereas NMBS/SNCB and other operators were responsible for rolling stock. Following some serious accidents (i.e. Halle train collision) caused by missing or malfunctioning protection systems, there was the obvious target to raise the security level in the whole network.

The first line in ETCS operation was HSL 3 in 2007, which is 56 km (35 mi) long. Because of lack of trains equipped with ETCS, the commercial start of operations was in 2009 with ICE 3 and Thalys trains. The operations started with ETCS SRS 2.2.2 and were later upgraded to 2.3.0.

The HSL 4 high-speed line was constructed at the same time as HSL 3 and so got the same ETCS equipment. Testing began in 2006, and commercial traffic started about 2008 with locomotive-hauled trains under Level 1. In 2009 commercial high-speed traffic started under ETCS L2 with supported Thalys- and ICE-trains like on HSL 3. A special feature is the first full-speed gapless border crossing under ETCS L2 supervision with HSL Zuid.

By 2009, all railway lines in Belgium were covered by GSM-R, a foundation of ETCS L2 installation and also useful in L1 operation.

In 2011 was released a first national ETCS–Masterplan, which was renewed in 2016. It names following four phases of ETCS introduction:

- Phase 1: TBL1+ programme completed (until end of 2015, succeeded);
- Phase 2: Network fully equipped with ETCS and TBL+ (2016–2022, in progress);
- Phase 3: Making ETCS the only technical standard and removing of TBL+ (until 2025);
- Phase 4: Convergence towards a homogeneous version of ETCS L2 (about 2030–2035).

The first conventional railway line equipped with ETCS L1 was Brussels–Liège. It started public service in March 2012.

Next was in December 2014 the Liefkenshoek rail link with ETCS L2 in Antwerp, connecting the left and right banks of the river Scheldt by tunnel for cargo traffic.

Infrabel had budgeted about €332 million for signalling including ETCS in 2015. After tendering it was given in summer 2015 a long time order to the consortium of Siemens Mobility and Cofely-Fabricom about the installation of ETCS Level 2 on more than 2,200 km (1,400 mi) of track. The order includes the delivery of computer based interlockings for the full network until 2025.

The complete Belgian part of the European north-south Corridor C (port of Antwerp–Mediterranean Sea) with a length of about 430 km (270 mi) is crossable with ETCS Level 1 since the end of 2015. According to Infrabel this was the longest conventional railway supported with ETCS in Europe.

Summarizing at end of 2015, there were 1,225 km (761 mi) mainlines (about a fifth of the network) usable with ETCS L1 or L2.

In 2016, NMBS/SNCB issued an order for 1362 M7 double-deck coaches. They were to be delivered between 2018 and 2021 and be fully ETCS equipped, for replacement of older types.

As of May 2025, 83% of the Infrabel network was equipped with a form of ETCS.

=== Canada ===
Alstom will be implementing ERTMS, including ETCS, in the upgrade of the commuter rail network of Toronto area regional operator GO Transit, under contract to the Ontario provincial agency Metrolinx. The first line to receive ETCS signalling will be the Richmond Hill line.

=== China (People's Republic) ===
- October 2008: Opening of Beijing–Tianjin Intercity Railway equipped with ETCS Level 1.
- December 2009: Opening of Wuhan–Guangzhou High-Speed Railway equipped with CTCS Level 3 (based on ETCS Level 2).

=== Croatia ===
In Croatia, Croatian Railways deployed Level 1 on the Vinkovci–Tovarnik line in 2012.

=== Czech Republic ===
The Czech LS train protection system is not as advanced as the systems used in Germany, Austria, Switzerland and other Western European countries. Moreover, the LS system is present only on the main lines that use automatic block signalling. Lines that use telephonic block or tokenless block do not have any train protection system at all, such as the Prague-Radotín–Beroun (–Plzeň) main line. Because of this, the ETCS was highly anticipated by Czech railway experts since the beginning. The first trials of the ETCS Level 2 started on a section of the Prague–Ostrava main line between Poříčany and Kolín in 2008. The first full-scale implementation project was installed on the Kolín–Česká Třebová–Brno–Břeclav rail line (excluding the Brno rail junction) in 2014. In 2017, the plan to install ETCS Level 2 on the TEN-T lines was revealed. In 2021, the Czech government decided to implement the ETCS on the entire rail network. The TEN-T corridors are prioritized and most of them have been already equipped with ETCS Level 2, excluding the sections that await complete refurbishment, such as Prague–Beroun or Brno–Přerov. The first line operated exclusively under ETCS Level 2 supervision is the Olomouc–Uničov branch line with 160 km/h top speed. The exclusive ETCS Level 2 operation on this line started in January 2023, the automatic block signalling is not equipped with trackside light signals and relies solely on the ETCS. The TEN-T corridors that are equipped with ETCS Level 2 will be operated solely under ETCS since 1 January 2025. Vehicles not equipped with operational ETCS on-board units will not be allowed to use these lines. Light signals will be kept in operation to cope with shunting, ETCS failures, signalling disruptions during construction works etc.

Branch lines are to be equipped with Level 1 Limited Supervision or with a simplified version called ETCS STOP. Up to this day (2024), many of them do not have any conventional signalling system, as the train movements are dispatched only by telephone or radio (the so-called D3 operation). Thus the installation of ETCS has to be preceded by a new signalling system on these lines. The deployment of the ETCS on the entire network is expected to be finished by 2040.

=== Denmark ===
As of May 2025, full implementation is expected in Jylland by 2027 and everywhere else by 2033.

In December 2008: In Denmark, plans were announced in for the conversion of its entire national network to Level 2. This was necessitated by the near obsolete nature of parts of its network. The total cost of the project is estimated at €3.3 billion, with conversion beginning in 2009 and projected for completion in 2021. Denmark has decided to drop its older ATC, which will reach its end of life between 2015 and 2020, switching the network of 2100 km to ETCS. The S-train network in Copenhagen will use the Siemens TrainGuard system. Two suppliers will equip the rest of the country to Level 2 with an option for Level 3 (ERTMS Regional) in rural parts. Implementation will be between 2014 and 2018. Denmark will be the first to introduce GPRS support on its network by 2017. Hence Banedanemark is driving this development with other ETCS users in Europe that has led to the inclusion in B3R2 in late 2015. Due to complexity the completion date was moved by two years to 2023, especially for testing in the S-train network, while the equipment of the first three main lines will be done in 2018.

In November 2017: Further delays of the complete roll-out from 2023 to 2030 were announced, as the following dilemma appeared: ETCS must be introduced before electrification. Electrification must be introduced before new trains are obtained. New trains must be purchased before ETCS is introduced. Because the old signalling system was not built compatible with electrification, and many components (which often have to be developed anew and be certified) must be replaced to make them compatible, expensive and time-consuming and fairly meaningless if it shall soon be replaced by ETCS. Diesel trains must mainly be custom-made and are expensive (like the IC4) because of little demand in Europe, and DSB wants to have electric trains for the future. But most lines are not electrified yet. The plan was to fit the existing old diesel trains such as IC3 with ETCS, but that has proven difficult, since they are not well documented because various ad hoc spare parts have been fitted in various ways and other problems. Furthermore, the new Copenhagen–Ringsted high-speed line was planned for opening in 2018 with ETCS only, creating a deadline, but there is a decision to introduce old signalling there, and delay ETCS roll-out for several years (still the dilemma must be solved by fitting ETCS into the trains).

In September 2022: The roll-out proceeds according to the delayed plan; some lines in the Jutland peninsula have been successfully converted and the goal of complete roll-out in 2030 is confirmed.

=== France ===
- June 2007: The LGV Est from Vaires-sur-Marne (Seine-et-Marne) near Paris to Baudrecourt (Moselle) opens with ETCS. It is an extension to the French high-speed TGV network, connecting Paris and Strasbourg.
- July 2017: The LGV BPL from Connerré (near Le Mans) to Rennes opens with ETCS L2.
- July 2017: The LGV SEA from Tours to Bordeaux opens with ETCS L2.
- By 2025: SNCF Réseau is currently upgrading the LGV Sud-Est (LGV 1) to ETCS L2 standards. Deployment is scheduled for 2025.
- From 2027, SNCF Réseau will begin deployment of the ETCS L3 Hybrid on the line from Marseille to Ventimiglia as part of the project for the new high speed line between Marseille and Nice.

=== Germany ===
Lines equipped with ETCS L1 (light blue) and ETCS L2 (dark blue) in Germany (as of December 2024)

Germany intends to use Level 1 only as Limited Supervision – neither Full Supervision nor Euroloops will be installed.

The first project that was intended to implement ETCS was the Köln–Frankfurt high-speed rail line that had been under construction since 1995. Due to the delays in the ETCS specification a new variant of LZB (CIR ELKE-II) was implemented instead.

The next planned and first actual implementation was on the Leipzig-Ludwigsfelde main line to Berlin. There, SRS 2.2.2 was tested together with a PZB and LZB mixed installation in conditions of fast and mixed traffic. The section was co-financed by the EU and DB to gain more experience with the ETCS Level 2 mode. Since April 2002 the ETCS section was in daily usage and in March 2003 it was announced that it had reached the same degree of reliability as before using ETCS. Since 6. December 2005 an ETCS train ran at 200 km/h (125 mph) as a part of the normal operation plan on the line north of Leipzig to obtain long-term recordings. As of 2009, the line had been decommissioned for ETCS and is henceforth in use with LZB and PZB. In May 2022 construction started for a new SRS 3.4.0 installation between Berlin and Leipzig.

In 2011, the installation of ETCS L2 (SRS 2.3.0d) was ordered for 14 Mio EUR following the reconstruction and enhancement of the railway line Berlin-Rostock. A first part of 35 km was finished at the end of 2013 between Lalendorf and Kavelstorf, but never went into service.

The newly built Ebensfeld–Erfurt segment of Nuremberg–Erfurt high-speed railway as well as the Erfurt–Leipzig/Halle high-speed railway and the upgraded Erfurt–Eisenach segment of the Halle–Bebra railway are equipped with ETCS L2. The north-eastern part (Erfurt–Leipzig/Halle) is in commercial use since December 2015 exclusively with ETCS L2 SRS 2.3.0d. The southern part (Ebensfeld–Erfurt) started test running and driver training in the end of August 2017 and regular operation with ETCS L2 in December 2017. Starting in December 2017 there are about 20 high-speed trains per day from Munich to Berlin. ETCS on the western part (Erfurt–Eisenach) was also scheduled for commencing operation in December 2017 but commission was delayed until August 2018.

Germany started replacing some of its PZB and LZB systems in 2015. During 2014 it was planned to use a dual equipment for the four main freight corridors to comply with the EC 913/2010 regulation. Further testing showed that a full ETCS system can increase capacity by 5-10% leading into a new concept "Zukunft Bahn" to accelerate the deployment, presented in December 2015. The overall cost reduction of about half a billion euro may be reinvested to complete the switch to ETCS that may take about 15 years. The Deutsche Bahn expected to get further federal funding after the 2017 German federal election. In a first step, another 1750 km of existing railway lines are planned to be equipped with ETCS until 2023, focusing on the Rhine-Alpine corridor, the Paris–Southwest Germany corridor and border-crossing lines.

With Germany pressing for Baseline 3, neighbouring countries like Austria intend to update their rolling stock, especially by modernizing the GSM-R radio on their trains. One of the last additions to B3R2 was the usage of EDGE in GSM-R. This is already widely deployed in the German rail network (including better frequency filters for the GSM-R radio equipment).

In January 2018 the project "Digitale Schiene" (digital rail) was unveiled that intended to bring about a transition plan by mid 2018. Deutsche Bahn intends to equip 80% of the rail network with GSM-R by 2030 razing any lineside signals in the process. This will bring about 20% more trains that can be operated in the country. In the process 160,000 signals and 400,000 km (250,000 mi) of interlocking cables will be disposed of. The Digital Rail project came about shortly after the Nuremberg–Erfurt high-speed railway was operational in December 2017 being the first high-speed line to have no lineside signals anymore. After some teething problems with radio reception it settled within the expected range of usability.

Priority is on the 1,450 km (900 mi) Rhine Corridor that is about to be equipped with ETCS Level 2. Bringing ETCS to the corridor has been agreed on at the EU level in 2016 as part of the TEN Core network that has expectations set to 2023. The Digital Rail project of 2018 has set the completion date to 2022 for using ETCS Level 2 while Switzerland intends to switch to ETCS Level 2 no later than 2025. Switzerland is expecting an increase in capacity of 30% that will probably come out the same on congested sections along the Rhine.

=== Greece ===
ETCS Level 1 will be deployed on the Athens-Thessaloniki railway, the first in Greece. The system was expected to be ready by late 2023. ETCS Level 1 is expected to be installed as part of electrification and modernisation works on the Palaifarsalos to Kalambaka line which began in 2022. Work to install ETCS Level 1 also began in 2022 on the Thessaloniki-Idomeni railway. As of July 2026, according to Christos Palios, chief executive of Hellenic Railways, the system is installed but not operational.

=== Hungary ===
In Hungary, the Zalacséb–Hodoš line was equipped with Level 1 as a pilot project in 2006. The Budapest–Hegyeshalom Level 1 was launched in 2008, and it was extended to Rajka (GYSEV) in 2015. The Békéscsaba-Lőkösháza line was equipped with Level 1 as an extension of the Level 2 network until further refurbishments will take place.

In Hungary Level 2 is under construction on the Kelenföld-Székesfehérvár line as a part of a full reconstruction, and was planned to be ready before 2015, but due to problems with the installation of GSM-R, all of them are delayed. The Level 2 system is under construction in several phases, currently: Boba-Hodoš, Székesfehérvár station, Székesfehérvár-Ferencváros, Ferencváros-Monor, Monor-Szajol, Szajol-Gyoma and Gyoma-Békéscsaba sections. GYSEV is currently installing Level 2 to the Sopron-Szombathely-Szentgotthárd line.

Work on the expansion of the Belgrade-Budapest railway line has stopped because the Chinese contractors are not equipped to build ETCS.

=== India ===
National Capital Region Transport Corporation has decided to equip European Train Control System (ETCS) on its Sarai Kale Khan hub in India's First Rapid Rail corridor Delhi-Meerut RRTS Route. However, the national train protection system Kavach, which unifies the key features of the ETCS and the Indian Anti-Collision Device, seems to become more widespread. ETCS Hybrid was deployed as the first line in the world on the Delhi–Meerut line in October 2023.

=== Indonesia ===
Palembang LRT is equipped with ETCS Level 1 and PT. LEN Industri (Persero) provides the trackside fixed-block signalling.

=== Italy ===
- December 2005: Rome–Naples high-speed railway opens with ETCS Level 2.
- February 2006: ETCS Level 2 is extended to the Turin–Milan high-speed line on the section between Turin and Novara.
- December 2008: Opening of Milano–Bologna line.
- Autumn/Winter 2009: Opening of High Speed lines Novara–Milano and Bologna–Florence, thus completing the whole HS line Turin-Naples.
- December 2016: Opening of high-speed line Treviglio-Brescia, part of Milan-Verona line.
- December 2016: Italy has 704 km (437 mi) of high-speed lines which use Level 2. These lines do not overlap with national signaling systems and do not have side light signals. They are connecting Torino to Naples in 5 1/2 hours and Milan to Rome in 2 hours 50 minutes.

As of June 2022 the plan is to equip 3400 km of lines by 2026 and the entire State-owned network (16,800 km) by 2036.

=== Israel ===
In Israel ETCS Level 2 will begin replacing PZB in 2020. Three separate tenders were issued in 2016 for this purpose (one contract each was let for track-side infrastructure, rolling-stock integration, and the erection of a GSM-R network). Initial test runs of the system began on 31 March 2020. Concurrent with the implementation of ERTMS are railway electrification works, and an upgrade of the signaling system in the northern portion of Israel Railways' network from relay-based to electronic interlocking. (The southern portion of the network already employs electronic signaling.)

=== Libya ===
In Libya, Ansaldo STS was awarded a contract in July 2009 to install Level 2. This has stalled because of civil war.

=== Luxembourg ===
Procurement for ETCS started in 1999 and the tender was won by Alcatel SEL in July 2002. By 1 March 2005 a small network had been established that was run under ETCS Level 1. The track-side installations were completed in 2014 after spending about €33 million.

The equipment of the rolling stock did take a bit longer. In early 2016 it became known that the new Class 2200 could not run on Belgium lines. In February 2017 the changeover of Class 3000 was not even started, and Class 4000 had just one prototype installation. However the problems were resolved later with the complete rolling stock having ETCS installations by December 2017.

The government had pushed for the changeover following the rail accident of Bettembourg on 14 February 2017. With the rolling stock being ready as well, the end date of the usage of the old Memor-II+-systems was set to 31 December 2019. With the decision of 29 January 2018 all trains have to use ETCS by default and it should be continued to use on tracks in Belgium and France as far as possible.

=== Mexico ===
- Line 1 of the Tren Suburbano, which is about 27 km (17 mi) long, is equipped with ETCS Level 1 since 2018.
- ETCS Level 2 is used on the 57.7 km (35.9 mi) long Toluca–Mexico City commuter rail.

=== Morocco ===
ETCS equips and will equip the high-speed lines that link Tangier to Kénitra (in service from 2018) and Kénitra to Casablanca via Rabat (under construction, planned to open in 2020). Other high-speed lines planned to link Casablanca to Agadir and Rabat to Oujda from 2030 will likely be equipped as well.

=== Netherlands ===
- 2001: ETCS Pilot Projects. Bombardier Transportation Rail Control Solutions and Alstom Transportation each equipped a section of line and two test trains with ETCS Level 1 and Level 2. The Bombardier Transportation project was installed between Steenwijk and Heerenveen. The Alstom project was installed between Maastricht and Heerlen. The trains used were former "Motorpost" self-propelled postal vans. One of these - 3024 - is still operational with Bombardier equipment in 2018. The pilot line equipment was dismantled in 2005.
- June 2007: The Betuweroute, a new cargo line with ETCS Level 2 between the port of Rotterdam and the German border opens for commercial traffic.
- September 2009: HSL-Zuid/HSL 4 opened to commercial traffic. It is a new 125 km (78 mi) long high-speed line between the Netherlands and Belgium that uses ETCS Level 2 with a fallback option to ETCS Level 1 (although restricted to 160 km/h (100 mph) in the Netherlands).
- December 2011: Entry to operation of the rebuilt and 4-tracked Holendrecht - Utrecht line with dual-signalling Class B ATB-EG/vV and ETCS Level 2
- December 2012: The newly constructed Hanzelijn between Lelystad and Zwolle entered service with dual-signalling Class B ATB-EG/vV and ETCS Level 2

=== New Zealand ===
- April 2014: ETCS Level 1 was commissioned in the Auckland Metro network for KiwiRail by Siemens Rail Automation, in conjunction with the introduction of the ETCS-compliant AM class electric multiple units.
- 2023: Kiwirail is implementing ETCS level 2 as part of a project to rebuild Wellington Junction.

=== Norway ===
In August 2015 the eastern branch of the Østfold Line becomes first the line with ETCS functionality in Norway.

=== Philippines ===
In 2022, Level 1 was installed by Alstom on the Manila LRT Line 1 in preparation for the Cavite extension of the line. Level 1 shall also be installed for the South Main Line as part of the PNR South Long Haul project, and as a minimum requirement on the Mindanao Railway.

Level 2 will also be installed on the North–South Commuter Railway with a maximum speed of 160 km/h (100 mph). Hitachi Rail STS (formerly Ansaldo STS) is the sole bidder for the supply of such equipment.

=== Poland ===
In Poland, Level 1 was installed in 2011 on the CMK high-speed line between Warsaw and Katowice-Kraków, to allow speeds to be raised from 160 km/h (100 mph) to 200 km/h (125 mph), and eventually to 250 km/h (155 mph). The CMK line, which was built in the 1970s, was designed for a top speed of 250 km/h (155 mph), but was not operated above 160 km/h (100 mph) due to lack of cab signalling. The ETCS signalling on the CMK was certified on 21 November 2013, allowing trains on the CMK to operate at 200 km/h (125 mph).

In Poland, Level 2 has been installed as part of a major upgrade of the 346 km (215 mi) Warsaw-Gdańsk-Gdynia line that reduced Warsaw – Gdańsk travel times from five to two hours and 39 minutes in December 2015. Level 2 has been installed on line E30 between Legnica – Węgliniec – Bielawa Dolna on the German border and is being installed on the Warsaw-Łódź line. As of 2024 the CMK high-speed line is being upgraded to allow a maximum speed of 250 km/h (155 mph) by upgrading the existing L1 ETCS signalling to L2, until the works are completed by the end of 2025 the maximum speed has been reduced to 160 kilometres per hour (100 mph).

According to a Tender put out by the infrastructure manager - PKP PLK, a part of the E30 railway between two major population centers - Katowice and Kraków - will be equipped with ETCS L2 signalling by 2027. This will not result in a higher speed limit, as the line is only built for a maximum speed of 160 km/h (100 mph)

=== Slovakia ===
In Slovakia, Level 1 has been deployed as part of the Bratislava–Košice mainline modernisation program, currently between Bratislava (Výh. Svätý Jur) and Žilina (AH Príkrik), with the rest of the line to follow on Level 2. The current implementation is limited to 160 km/h (100 mph) due to limited braking distances between the control segments. In addition, Level 2 has been installed on the route Žilina - Čadca.

=== Spain ===
- December 2004: Zaragoza – Huesca high-speed line in Spain opens with ETCS Level 1.
- December 2007: Córdoba-Málaga High speed line in Spain opens with ETCS Level 1, in addition with LZB and the Spanish ATP system ASFA. Also, the line has been equipped with ETCS Level 2.
- December 2007: Madrid-Segovia-Valladolid high-speed line opens with ETCS Level 1, with plans to upgrade to Level 2 in the future.
- December 2009: Madrid-Zaragoza-Barcelona High speed line fully opens with ETCS level 2.
- December 2010: Madrid-Cuenca-Valencia and Madrid-Cuenca-Albacete High speed line opens with ETCS Level 1, but has also been equipped to upgrade to Level 2 in the future.
- October 2011: ETCS Level 2 was commissioned on the Madrid-Barcelona high speed line, allowing the speed to be raised to 310 km/h (195 mph) with Madrid-Barcelona travel times reduced to 2 hours 30 minutes.
- December 2011: Orense-Santiago high speed line opens with ETCS level 1, but has also been equipped to upgrade to level 2 in the future.
- January 2013: Barcelona-Girona-Figueres high speed line opens with ETCS level 1. This line connects France to Spain.

=== Sweden ===
- August 2010: In Sweden, the Bothnia Line was inaugurated using ETCS Level 2.
- November 2010: On West Dalarna Line in mid Sweden a demonstration run was made using ETCS Level 3 (ERTMS Regional).
- February 2012: Full commissioning of West Dalarna Line (Repbäcken-Malung) under ETCS Level 3 without lineside signals or track detection devices.
- May 2012: The Transport Administration in Sweden decided to delay the introduction of ERTMS into more Swedish railways a few years, because of the trouble on Botniabanan and Ådalsbanan railways, and unclear financing of rebuilding the rolling stock.
- December 2013: The Haparanda Line (Boden-Bredviken) reopened fitted with Level 2 ETCS. This project also included a new-built section of railway between Bredviken and Haparanda, replacing the old line which had a more inland route. The new line was built to 200 km/h high-speed standards.
- September 2024: ERTMS was deployed on parts of the Iron Ore Line and is planned on all of it in 2029, after years of delays. This was the first railway in Sweden and Norway to get ERTMS having high amount of traffic before deployment, and therefore trouble at introduction must be avoided.
- The introduction of ERTMS on the Southern Main Line Stockholm–Denmark, as part of an EU demand to fit all TEN-T routes with it, was planned for 2018. This has been delayed in multiple steps, and as of 2022 the plan is for cost reasons to deploy it where signalling control systems needs to be replaced anyway, starting around 2030 on the Southern Main Line, with planned finished replacement of all ATC installations in Sweden around 2050.

=== Switzerland ===
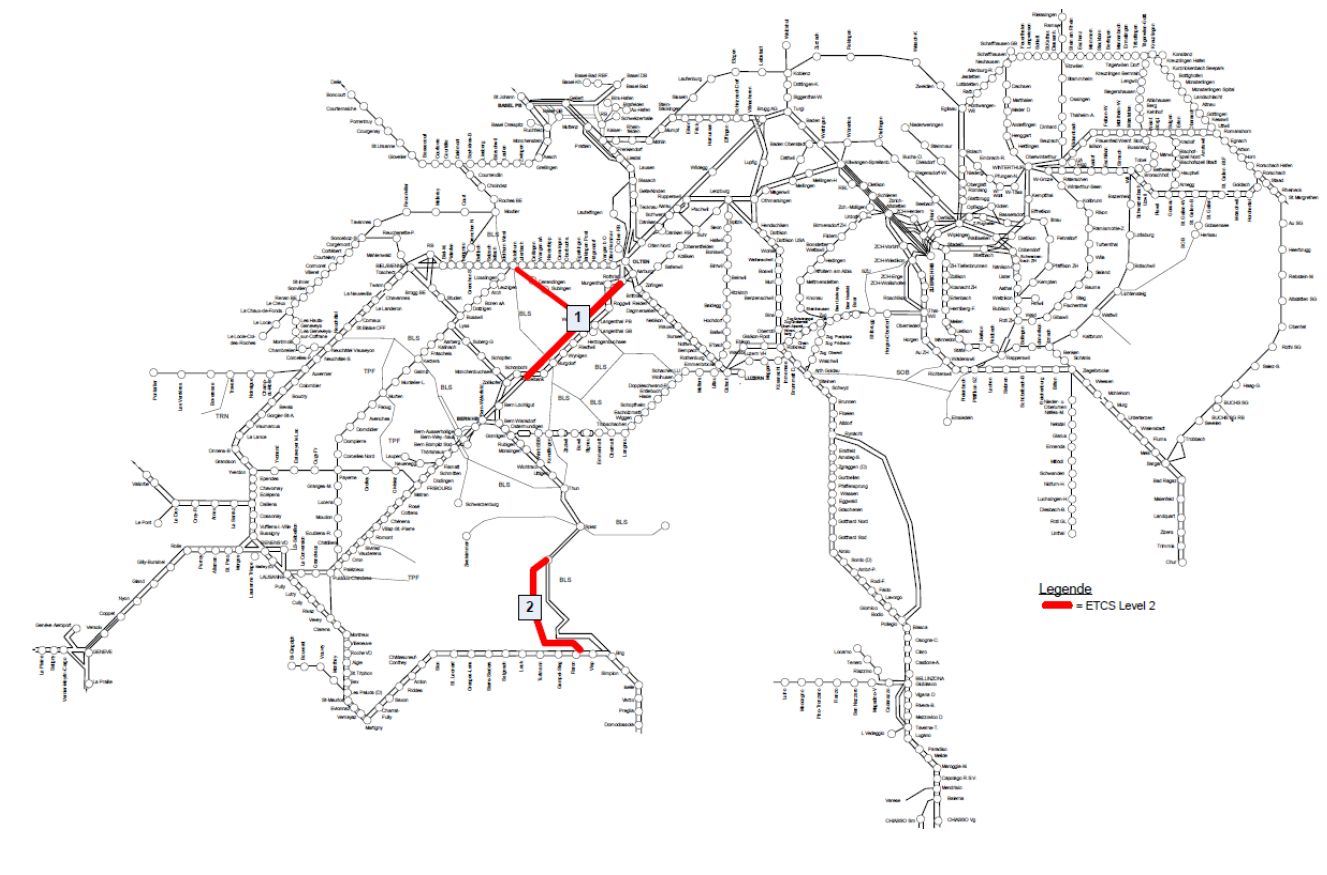
two high-speed lines have been using Level 2 in Switzerland by 2007 (shown red)

- December 2004: ETCS Level 2 is to be installed on the Mattstetten-Rothrist new line, a high-speed line opened in 2004 between Bern and Zürich for train speeds of 200 km/h (125 mph). This ETCS Level 2 installation was the pioneering ETCS installation in Switzerland. Technical problems with the new ETCS technology caused ETCS operation to be put off past the planned starting date.
- February 2006: ETCS Level 2 is finally installed on the Mattstetten–Rothrist line. ETCS Level 2 operation was fully implemented in March 2007.
- June 2007: The Lötschberg Base Tunnel, part of the Swiss NRLA project, opens with ETCS Level 2 and went in commercial use in December.
- Switzerland has announced in 2011 that it will switch from its national ZUB/Signum to ETCS Level 1 for conventional rail by enabling L1 LS packets on its transitional Euro-ZUB balises during 2017.
- As of September 2022, ETCS has been installed on the entire state-owned network, Level 2 is used on ten lines (section between Berne and Olten, base lines through the Lötschberg, Gotthard and Ceneri tunnels, sections between Lausanne and Sierre). The upgrade of the entire network to Level 2 is considered a long-term goal for which no explicit deadline has been set; conversion of lines will be continuously evaluated on a case-by-case basis.

=== Thailand ===
State Railway of Thailand uses ETCS Level 1 for the signalling on Bangkok's electrified suburban commuter rail system. ETCS Level 1 will also be installed in mainlines extended from Bangkok to Chumphon (Southern Line), Nakhon Sawan (Northern Line), Khon Kaen (Northeastern Line), Si Racha (Eastern Coast Line) and in shortcut line from Chachoengsao to Kaeng Khoi (Shortcut from Eastern Line to North/Northeastern Line) along with Double Tracking Phase I projects and ATP system upgrade of existing double track lines, both scheduled to be completed in 2022.

=== Turkey ===
In Turkey, Level 2 is installed on the Ankara–Konya high-speed line designed for 250 km/h (155 mph). The new 306 kilometres (190 mi) high-speed line has reduced Ankara-Konya travel times from 10 1/2 hours to 75 minutes.

=== United Kingdom ===
- October 2006: Network Rail announced that ETCS would be operational on the Cambrian Line in December 2008 and would cost £59million.
- 2008: On the Cambrian Line Network Rail will install in-cab ETCS Level 2, specification 2.3.0d. This level does not require conventional fixed signals – existing signals and RETB boards will be removed. Additionally, the lineside speed signs will be redundant – drivers are given the appropriate maximum speed on the cab display. The main supplier was Ansaldo STS. Interfleet Technology of Derby was commissioned to carry out the design for the passenger rolling stock and subsequently managed the installation on-site at LNWR, Crewe under contract to Ansaldo STS. Eldin Rail was contracted by Ansaldo STS as its infrastructure partner managing and installing all aspects of lineside infrastructure including the purpose-built Control Centre. During the design phase the key project stakeholders; Network Rail, Arriva Trains Wales and Angel Trains were all consulted to ensure the design was robust due to the criticality of the project, as the first installation of its kind in the UK. Twenty-four Class 158s were fitted as well as three Class 97/3 locomotives (formerly Class 37s) to be used for piloting services. The Class 97/3 design and installation was provided by Transys Projects of Birmingham for Ansaldo STS.
- February 2010: The Cambrian ETCS – Pwllheli to Harlech Rehearsal commenced on 13 February 2010 and successfully finished on 18 February 2010. The driver familiarisation and practical handling stage of the Rehearsal has provided an excellent opportunity to monitor the use of GSM-R voice in operation on this route. The first train departed Pwllheli at 0853hrs in ERTMS Level 2 Operation with GSM-R voice being used as the only means of communication between the driver and the signaller.
- October 2010: The commercial deployment of ETCS Level 2 by passenger trains started on the Cambrian Line between Pwllheli and Harlech in Wales without lineside signals.
- March 2011: Full commissioning of Cambrian Line (Sutton Bridge Junction-Aberystwyth or Pwllheli) in Wales under ETCS level 2.
- In 2013, a Network Rail class 97/3 locomotive with Hitachi's Level 2 onboard equipment successfully completed demonstration tests.
- July 2015: As part of the Thameslink Programme, ETCS is used for the first time in the Core using new British Rail Class 700 rolling stock. This upgrade is in order to raise capacity in the core to up to 24tph.
- 2020: The Heathrow branch of the Elizabeth line started using ETCS.
- November 2023: As part of the East Coast Digital Programme, the British Rail Class 717 operated in ETCS Level 2 in passenger service on the Northern City Line for the first time. The first train to transition was 717018 with train running number 2B11 on 27 November.
- 2025: ETCS was fitted to the 2008 A1 60163 Tornado, the first steam locomotive built in the UK in 50 years. This is the first time that a steam locomotive has been so fitted, and it is hoped that it will continue to make it legally possible to run heritage steam trains on the national network as the technology becomes a requirement.

=== Uruguay ===
The 273 km of Railway rebuilt in the Ferrocaril Central project between Montevideo and Pueblo Centenario alongside the line between Sayago and Peñarol stations have been equipped with ETCS Level 1 systems, this has produced controversy with railfans as many object that adopting this system conditions older rolling stock to be unable to run on the Ferrocaril Central line unless equipments are adapted, state-owned rail operators AFE and SELF had since 2018 a contract with Alta Rail Technologies for a proprietary ATC system called AUV but there haven't been reports of how it will integrate with the existing ETCS system

== See also ==
- Communications-based train control
- Interoperable Communications Based Signaling
