= Hardware compatibility list =

A hardware compatibility list (HCL) is a list of computer hardware (typically including many types of peripheral devices) that is compatible with a particular operating system or device management software. The list contains both whole computer systems and specific hardware elements including motherboards, sound cards, and video cards. In today's world, there is a vast amount of computer hardware in circulation, and many operating systems too. A hardware compatibility list is a database of hardware models and their compatibility with a certain operating system.

HCLs can be centrally controlled (one person or team keeps the list of hardware maintained) or user-driven (users submit reviews on hardware they have used).

There are many HCLs. Usually, each operating system will have an official HCL on its website.

== See also ==
- System requirements
