= West Dalarna Line =

Railway line in Sweden

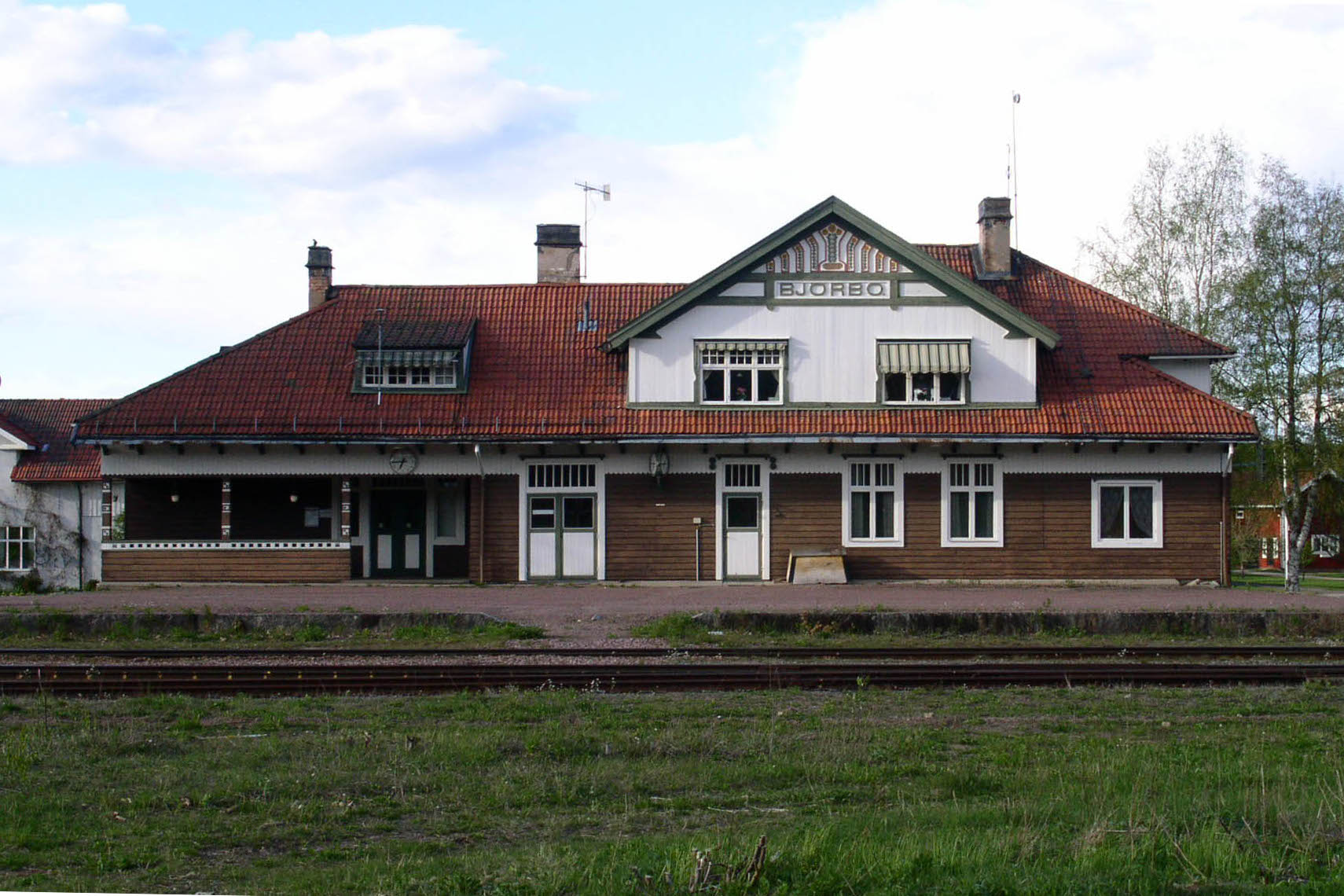
- Björbo station

Overview
- Owner: Swedish Transport Administration
- Termini: Repbäcken; Malung

Service
- Type: Railway
- System: Swedish railway network
- Operator(s): Green Cargo

History
- Opened: 1905-1934

Technical
- Line length: 129 km (80 mi)
- Number of tracks: Single
- Character: Freight, signaling test trains.
- Track gauge: 1,435 mm (4 ft 8 1/2 in) standard gauge
- Electrification: None
- Operating speed: 80 to 100 km/h (50 to 60 mph)
- Signalling: ERTMS Regional

The West Dalarna Line (Swedish: Västerdalsbanan), is a 129-kilometer (80 mi) long, unelectrified railway line between Malung and the Dala Line near Borlänge, in Dalarna County, Sweden. It has only freight traffic.

== History ==
The oldest part of the line is Repbäcken–Björbo, opened 1905. The newest is Vansbro–Malung, from 1934. Until the 1960s, the line extended to Särna about 130 km north of Malung. In 2011 the passenger traffic was discontinued in favour of rail-replacement buses because of the low track quality and the requirement to install the ERTMS signalling system into the trains, a 20 million SEK cost for the train owner (the county). Itino trains were used before then. The line is the first line in the world to get the ERTMS Regional signalling system, which started test operation late 2010, and full operation in February 2012.

The line is connected to the Dala Line at Repbäcken and the Bergslagen Line at Borlänge, and a 5-kilometer (3.1 mi) surviving stretch of the original alignment of the Inland Line branches off from Vansbro to the Dalasågen industrial area.

In the early-2020s, the Swedish Transport Administration announced its intention to replace ERTMS Regional with ETCS Level 2 with axle counters (Baseline 3 R2) on the Västerdalsbanan. The replacement is expected to be completed by 2025–2026, and may entail the re-introduction of passenger service on the Västerdalsbanan.
