= Bombardier Itino =

Bombardier diesel multiple unit trainset

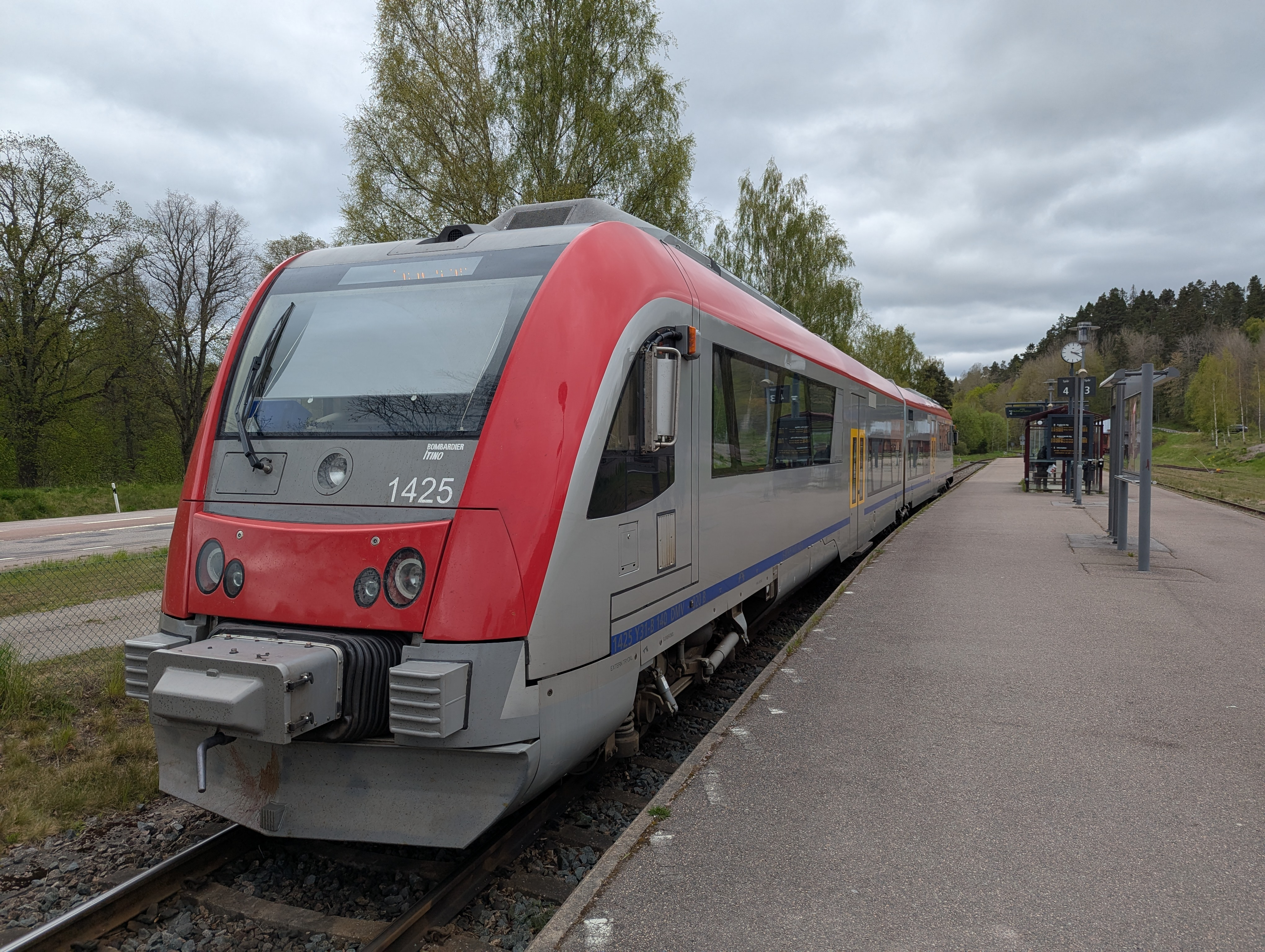
- A two-car Y31 Itino in 2025
- Stock type: Diesel multiple unit
- In service: 2002–present
- Manufacturer: Bombardier Transportation
- Built at: Hennigsdorf
- Constructed: 2002–2010
- Number built: 57
- Formation: 2 or 3 cars
- Lines served: Germany; Sweden

Specifications
- Train length: 38.4 m (125 ft 11.8 in) (2 cars); 54.7 m (179 ft 5.5 in) (3 cars)
- Doors: 4 (2 cars) 6 (3 cars)
- Articulated sections: 2 or 3
- Maximum speed: 140 km/h (90 mph)
- Weight: 61.5 t (60.5 long tons; 67.8 short tons) (2 cars); 82.5 t (81.2 long tons; 90.9 short tons) (3 cars)
- Prime mover: MAN
- Engine type: Diesel engine
- Power output: 1,280 kW (1,720 hp)
- Track gauge: 1,435 mm (4 ft 8 1/2 in) standard gauge

The Bombardier Itino is a family of diesel multiple units manufactured by Bombardier Transportation, originally developed by Adtranz. Trains of the family have two or three cars and are capable of speeds of around 140–160 km/h (90–100 mph). First introduced in 1998, a total of 57 units were manufactured at the former LEW Hennigsdorf factory between 2002 and 2010. The trains are in service in Germany and Sweden.

== Railways ==
=== Germany ===
In Germany, the Itino series has been designated as DB Class 615 and is operated on the Odenwaldbahn and the Erfurter Bahn. Twenty-seven units are currently operated by the two railways.

=== Sweden ===
In Sweden, the unit has the designations Y31, designating 2-car trains, and Y32, designating three-car trains. 30 units have been delivered and are currently operated by Jönköpings Länstrafik, Kalmar Länstrafik, Norrtåg, Värmlandstrafik and Västtrafik. The Itino replaced the Y1 railcars.

== Technology ==
The trains have two MAN diesel engines. The engines are based on truck engines, but larger (each 22 L (1,343 cu in)/cylinder volume), also used for boats and electrical generators. They have hydraulic transmission. Units built between 2008 and 2010 feature two engines from Iveco (also based on truck engines) and they fulfill the latest environmental requirements for trucks. They also have mechanical automatic gearboxes from ZF Friedrichshafen meant for trucks.

The distinctive angled window pillar bodyshell construction was previously introduced by ABB/ADtranz on the Regioshuttle.

== Brake problems ==
The multiple unit got a bad start in Sweden, when it was shown that the brakes could not cope with snow. This has led to the model being suspended during the winter for oversight, which mostly affected Tåg i Bergslagen (and SJ AB, which at the time was taking them into service) with its traffic on the Västerdalsbanan (passenger traffic ceased in 2011) where the two first units were used. It has also from time to time affected other operators in Sweden, such as Norrtåg in the winter of 2011–12. There have been many of other quality problems with these trains. For this reason, the Swedish Y31 and Y32 trains will likely be replaced by new CAF Civity Nordic bi-mode trains between 2024 and 2027.

== Gallery ==
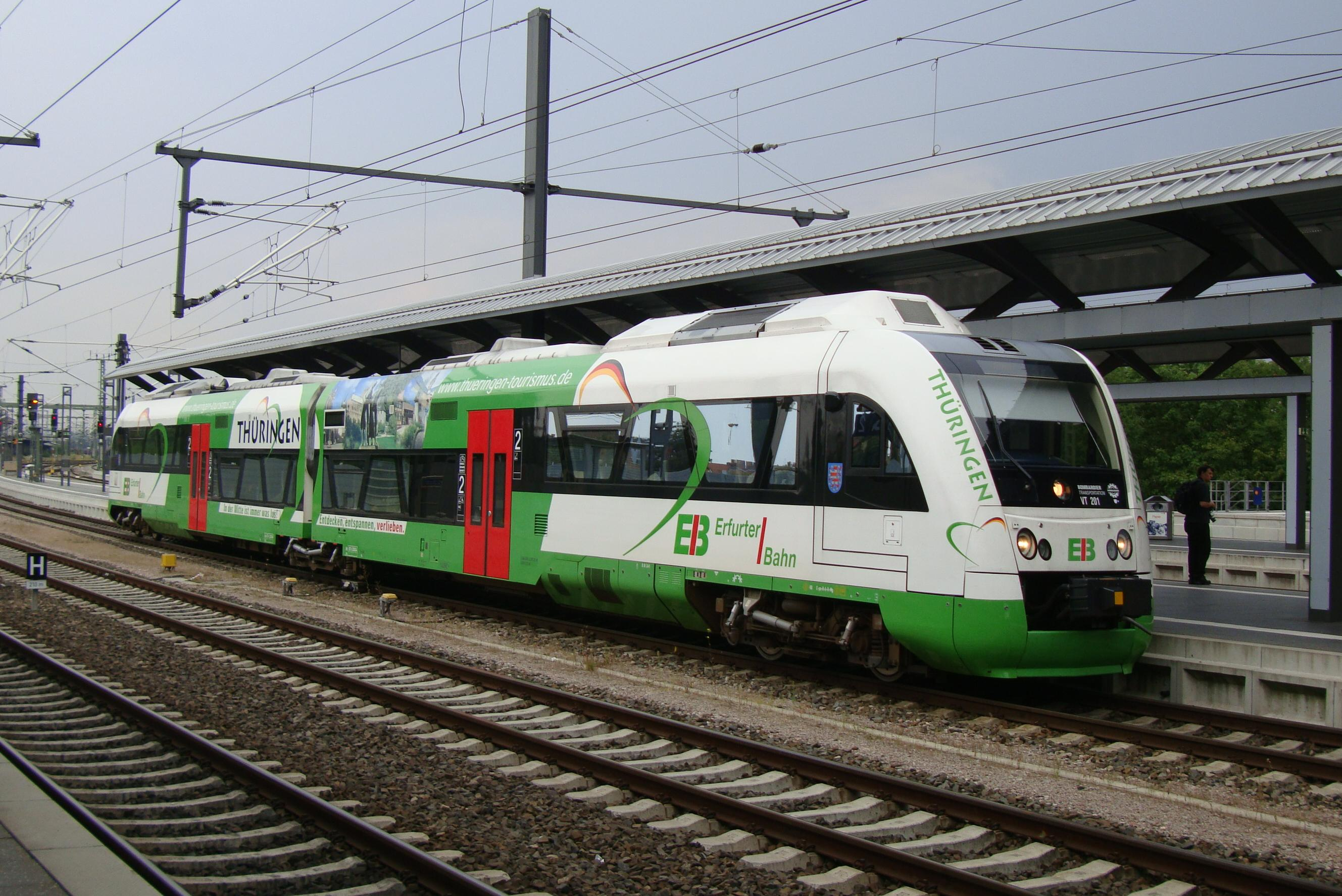
Erfurter Bahn Class 613 at Erfurt Hauptbahnhof

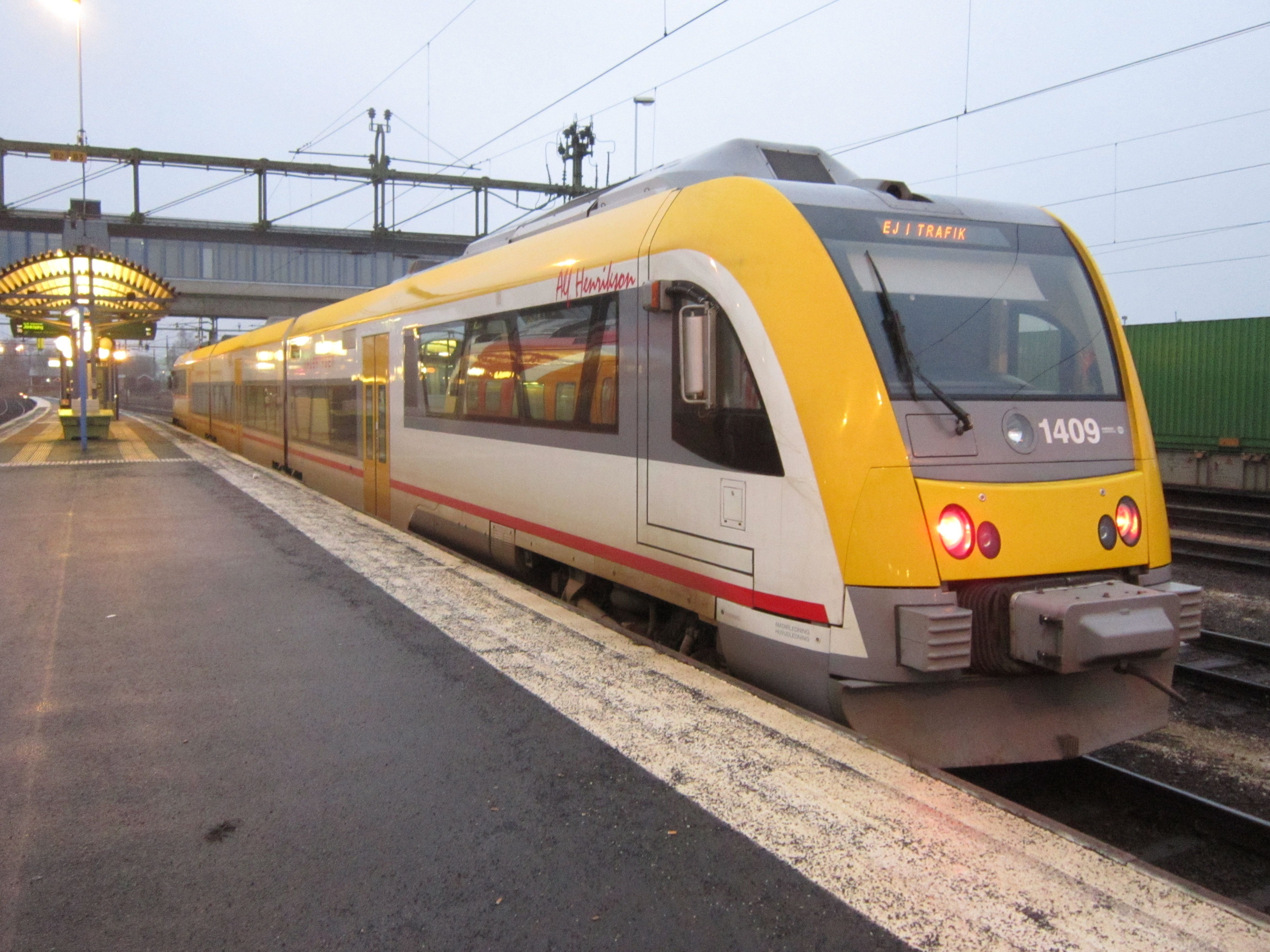
Krösatågen Y32 at Nässjö Central Station

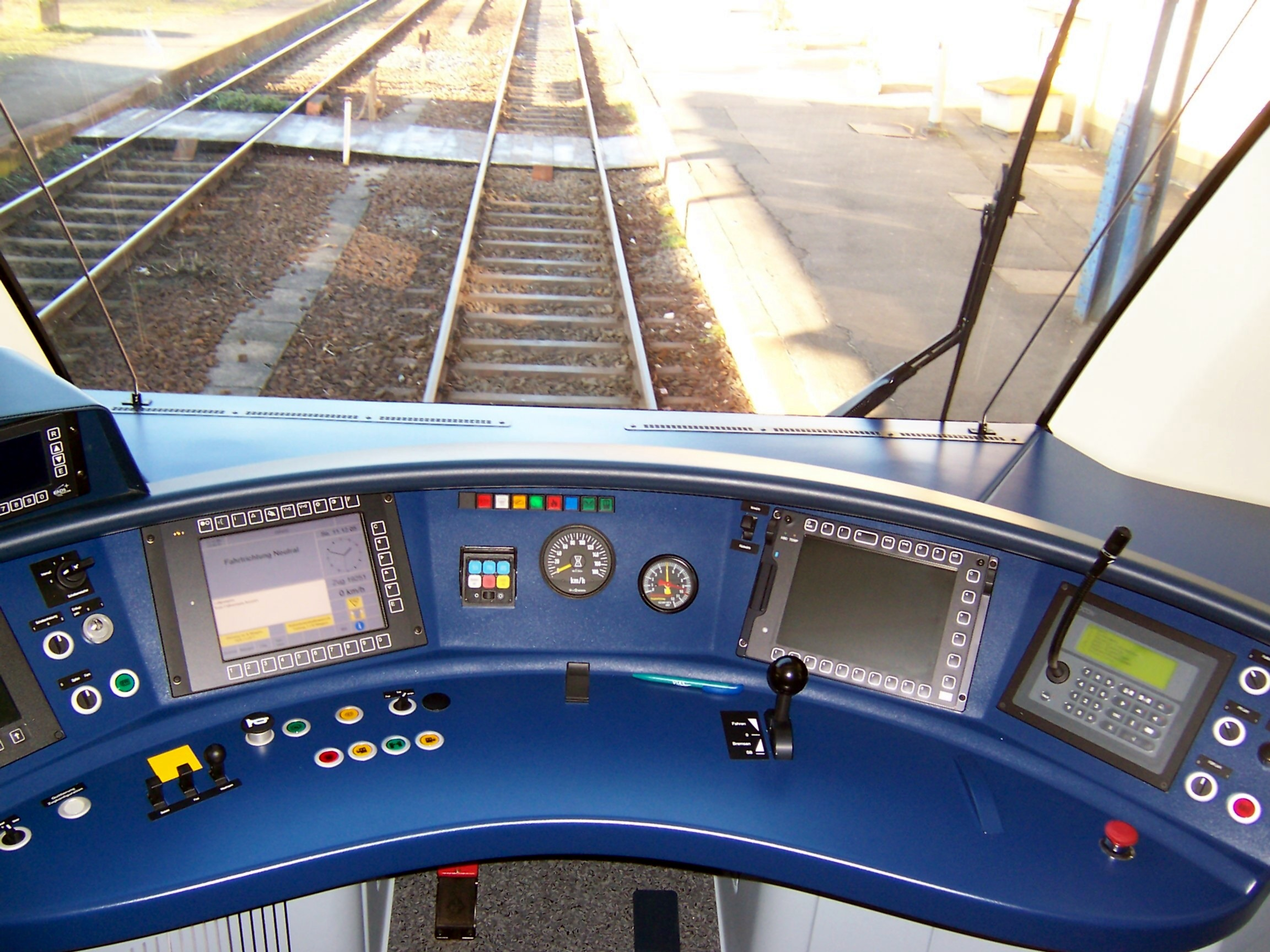
Driver panel (Odenwaldbahn version)

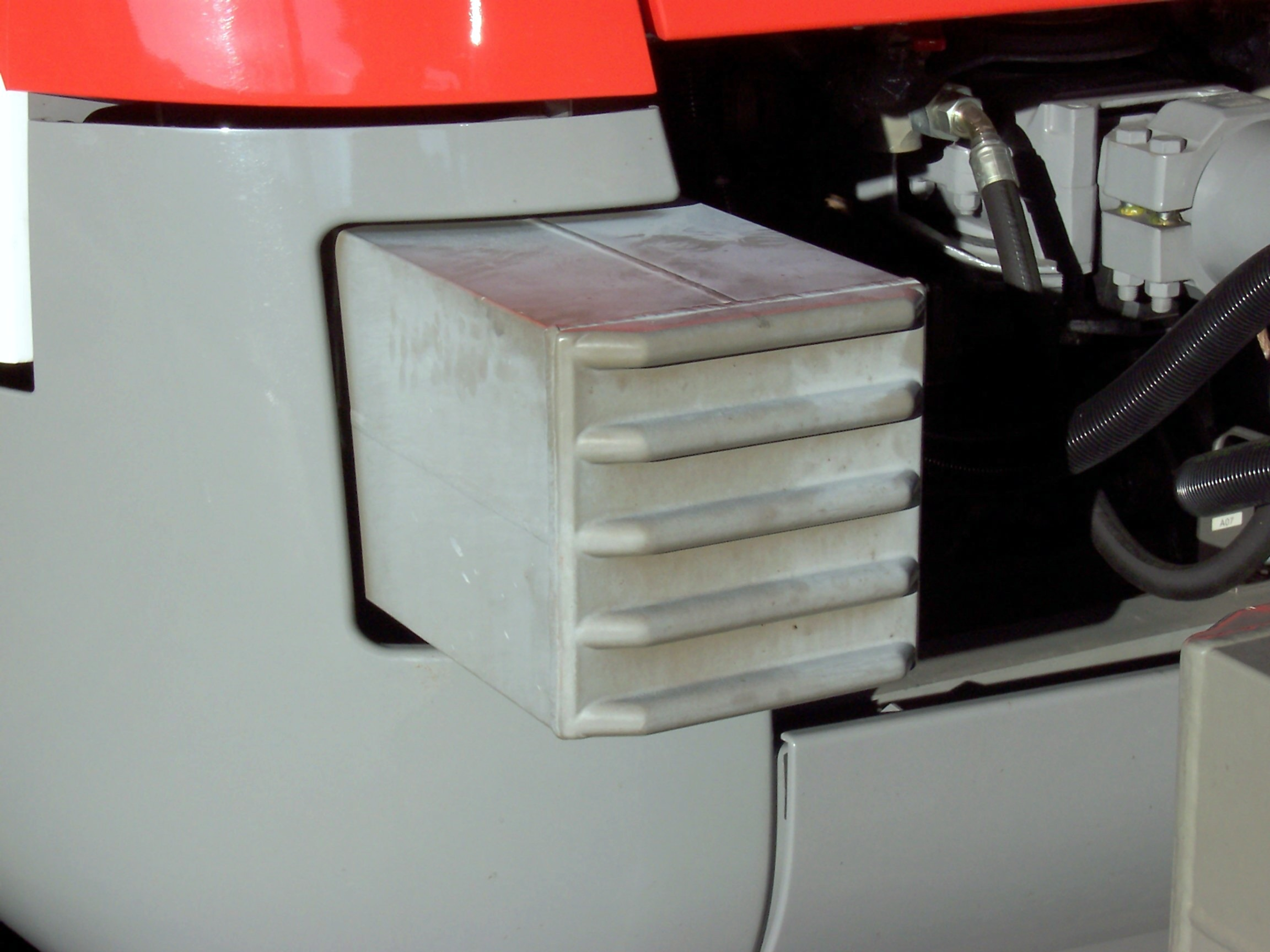
Crash element

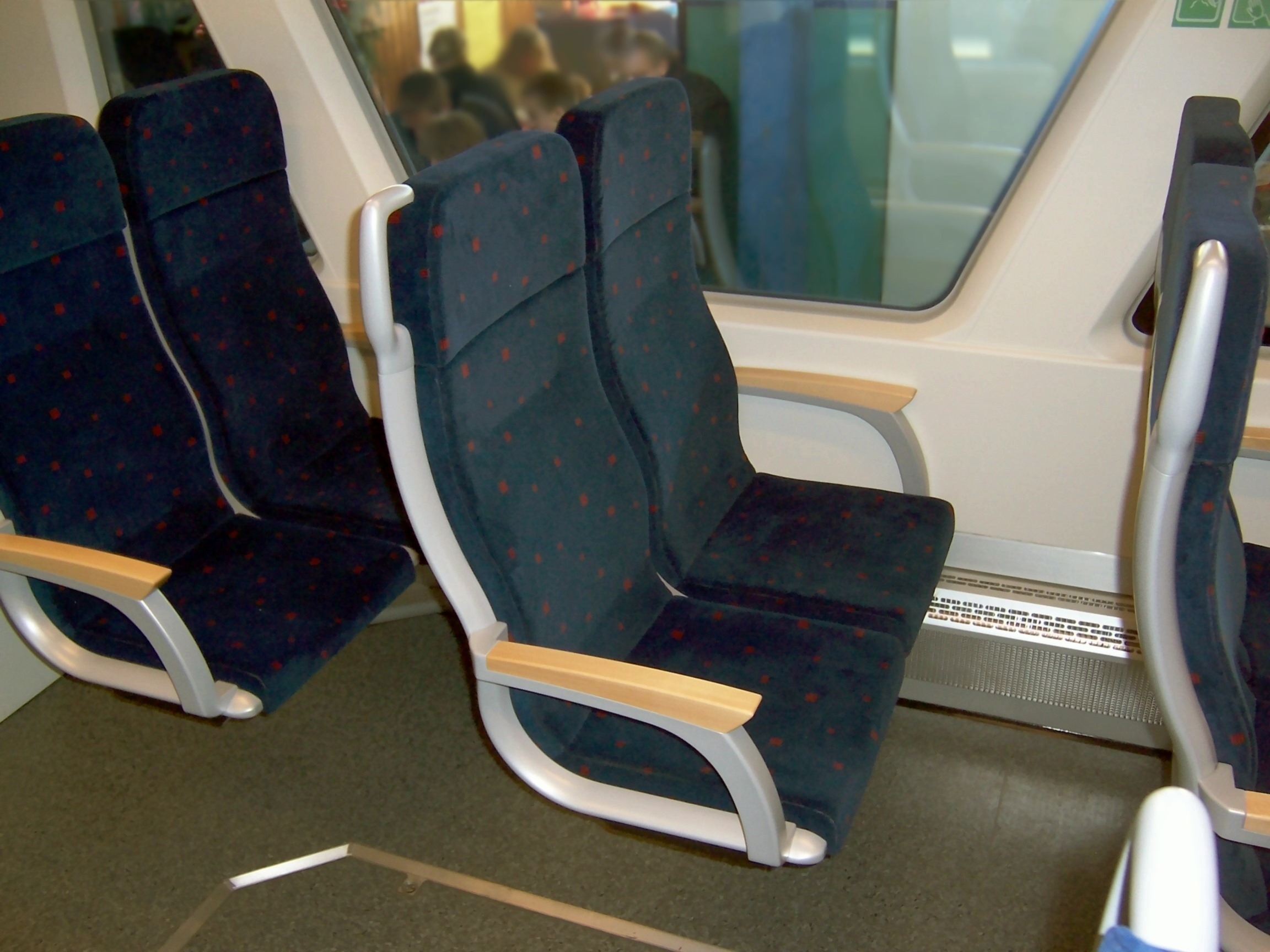
Second class seat

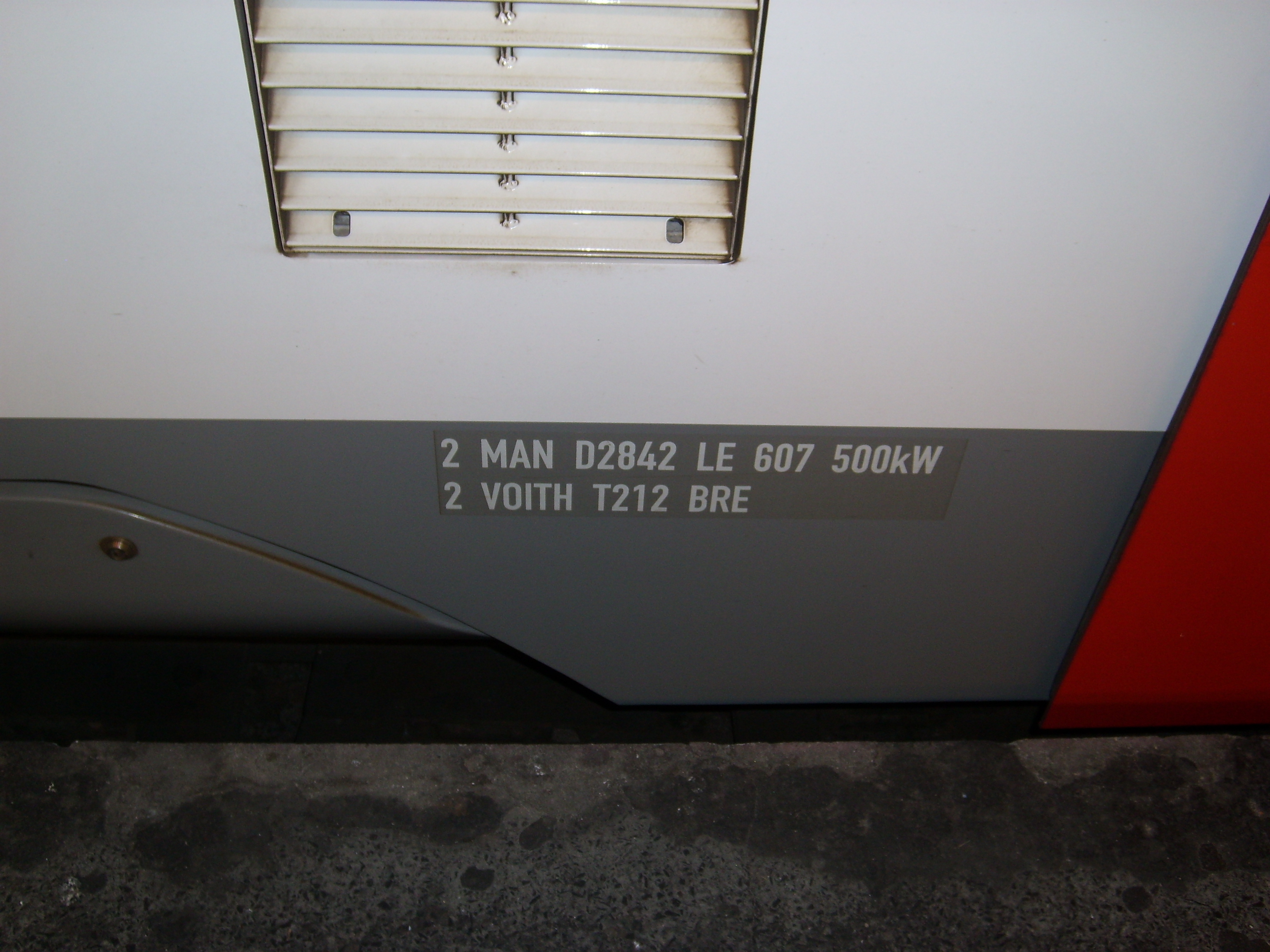
Side labels of an Itino in service of VIAS GmbH
