= Design specification =

Type of document

A design specification (or product design specification) is a document which details exactly what criteria a product or a process should comply with. If the product or its design are being created on behalf of a customer, the specification should reflect the requirements of the customer or client. A design specification could, for example, include required dimensions, environmental factors, ergonomic factors, aesthetic factors, maintenance requirement, etc. It may also give specific examples of how the design should be executed, helping others work properly (a guideline for what the person should do).

== Example of a design specification ==
An example design specification, which may be a physical product, software, the construction of a building, or another type of output. Columns and information may be adjustable based on the output format.

Example design specification (with a product design focus)
Number	Category	Demand / want	Weighting number	Requirement	Success criteria	Method of assessment	Date modified
1	Aesthetics	Demand	2	Product must be blue	Product is blue	Visual analysis	03-21
2	Cost	Demand	1	Product costs less than £300	Product is less than £300	Component cost analysis	03-21
3	Function	Want	3	Product is collapsible	Product can reduce by at least 1/2 its size	Prototype testing	05-21
4	...						

== Special requirements ==
Construction design specifications are referenced in US government procurement rules, where there is a requirement that an architect-engineer should specify using "the maximum practicable amount of recovered materials consistent with the performance requirements, availability, price reasonableness, and cost-effectiveness" in a construction design specification.

== See also ==
- Data sheet (Spec sheet)
- Design by contract
- Software requirements specification
- Specification

== Other sources ==
- Mohan, S., Dr. "Design Specifications", Dr. S. Mohan. N.p., n.d. Web. 27 Dec. 2015.
- "What Are Specifications?" Specificationsdenver. N.p., n.d. Web. 27 Dec. 2015.
