= Repbäcken =

- Location within Dalarna Location within Sweden
- Coordinates: 60°31′N 15°20′E
- Country: Sweden
- Province: Dalarna
- County: Dalarna County
- Municipality: Borlänge Municipality

Area
  - Total: 0.67 km^{2} (0.26 sq mi)

Population (31 December 2010)
  - Total: 220
  - Density: 329/km^{2} (850/sq mi)
- Time zone: UTC+1 (CET)
  - Summer (DST): UTC+2 (CEST)

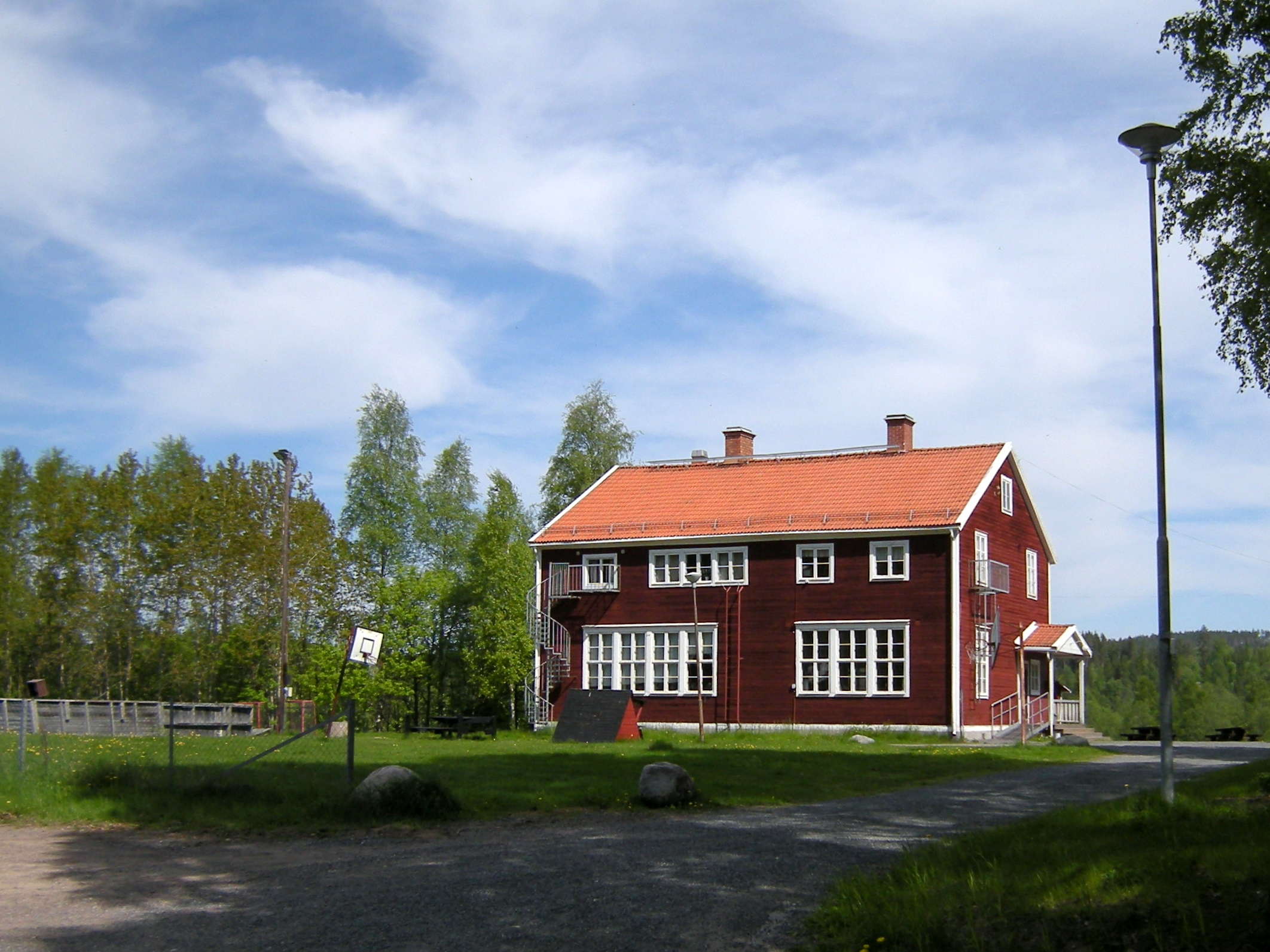
Repbäcken Community Center

Repbäcken is a locality situated in Borlänge Municipality, Dalarna County, Sweden with 220 inhabitants in 2010.
