= System requirements specification =

Description of a system to be built

A System Requirements Specification (SysRS) (abbreviated SysRS to be distinct from a software requirements specification (SRS)) is a structured collection of information that embodies the requirements of a system.

A business analyst (BA), sometimes titled system analyst, is responsible for analyzing the business needs of their clients and stakeholders to help identify business problems and propose solutions. Within the systems development life cycle domain, the BA typically performs a liaison function between the business side of an enterprise and the information technology department or external service providers.

== See also ==
- Business analysis
- Business process reengineering
- Business requirements
- Concept of operations
- Data modeling
- Information technology
- Process modeling
- Requirement
- Requirements analysis
- Software requirements specification
- Systems analysis
- Use case
