= Problem structuring methods =

Techniques used to model a situation to be changed

Problem structuring methods (PSMs) are a group of techniques used to model or to map the nature or structure of a situation or state of affairs that some people want to change. PSMs are usually used by a group of people in collaboration (rather than by a solitary individual) to create a consensus about, or at least to facilitate negotiations about, what needs to change. Some widely adopted PSMs include

- soft systems methodology
- the strategic choice approach
- strategic options development and analysis (SODA)

Unlike some problem solving methods that assume that all the relevant issues and constraints and goals that constitute the problem are defined in advance or are uncontroversial, PSMs assume that there is no single uncontested representation of what constitutes the problem.

PSMs are mostly used with groups of people, but PSMs have also influenced the coaching and counseling of individuals.

== History ==
The term "problem structuring methods" as a label for these techniques began to be used in the 1980s in the field of operations research, especially after the publication of the book Rational Analysis for a Problematic World: Problem Structuring Methods for Complexity, Uncertainty and Conflict. Some of the methods that came to be called PSMs had been in use since the 1960s.

Thinkers who later came to be recognized as significant early contributors to the theory and practice of PSMs include:

- Horst Rittel and Melvin M. Webber
- Russell L. Ackoff
- Peter Checkland
- Colin Eden and Fran Ackermann
- Robert L. Flood and Michael C. Jackson
- Jonathan Rosenhead and John Mingers

== Types of situations that call for PSMs ==
In discussions of problem structuring methods, it is common to distinguish between two different types of situations that could be considered to be problems. Rittel and Webber's distinction between tame problems and wicked problems (Rittel & Webber 1973) is a well known example of such types. The following table lists similar (but not exactly equivalent) distinctions made by a number of thinkers between two types of "problem" situations, which can be seen as a continuum between a left and right extreme:

Different types of situations, and thinkers who named them
Thinker	Left extreme	Right extreme
Rittel & Webber	Tame problem	Wicked problem
Herbert A. Simon	Programmed decision	Non-programmed decision
Russell L. Ackoff	Puzzle / Problem	Mess
Jerome Ravetz	Technical problem	Practical problem
Ronald Heifetz	Technical challenge	Adaptive challenge
Peter Checkland	Hard systems	Soft systems
Donald Schön	The high ground	The swamp
Barry Johnson	Problems to solve	Polarities to manage

Tame problems (or puzzles or technical challenges) have relatively precise, straightforward formulations that are often amenable to solution with some predetermined technical fix or algorithm. It is clear when these situations have changed in such a way that the problem can be called solved.

Wicked problems (or messes or adaptive challenges) have multiple interacting issues with multiple stakeholders and uncertainties and no definitive formulation. These situations are complex and have no stopping rule and no ultimate test of a solution.

PSMs were developed for situations that tend toward the wicked or "soft" side, when methods are needed that assist argumentation about, or that generate mutual understanding of multiple perspectives on, a complex situation. Other problem solving methods are better suited to situations toward the tame or "hard" side where a reliable and optimal solution is needed to a problem that can be clearly and uncontroversially defined.

== Characteristics ==
Problem structuring methods constitute a family of approaches that have differing purposes and techniques, and many of them had been developed independently before people began to notice their family resemblance. Several scholars have noted the common and divergent characteristics among PSMs.

Eden and Ackermann identified four characteristics that problem structuring methods have in common:

1. The methods focus on creating "a model that is populated with data that is specific to the problem situation". These cause–effect models can be analyzed (albeit in different ways by different methods), and the models are intended to facilitate conversation and negotiation between the participants.
2. The methods seek to increase the overall productivity of group processes. Productivity includes creating better agreements that are more likely to be implemented, and realizing (to the extent possible in the given situation) ideals such as communicative rationality and procedural justice.
3. The methods emphasize that the facilitation of effective group processes requires some attention to, and open conversation about, power and politics within and between organizations. Power and politics can become especially important when major change is being proposed.
4. The methods provide techniques and skills for facilitation of group processes, and they appreciate that such techniques and skills are essential for effective sensemaking, systems modeling, and participative decision-making. People who use PSMs must pay attention to what group facilitators call process skills (guiding interactions between people through nonlinear applications of the methods) and content skills (helping people build sufficiently comprehensive models of the given situation).

Rosenhead provided another list of common characteristics of PSMs, formulated in a more prescriptive style:

- Seek solutions which satisfice on separate dimensions rather than seeking an optimal decision on a single dimension.
- Integrate hard and soft (quantitative and qualitative) data with social judgments.
- Produce models that are as transparent as possible to and that clarify conflicts of interpretation, rather than hiding conflicts behind neutral technical language.
- Consider people to be agents actively involved in the decision-making process, rather than as passive objects to be modeled or ignored.
- Facilitate the problem structuring process from the bottom-up as much as possible, not only top-down from formal organizational leadership.
- Aim to preserve options in the face of unavoidable uncertainty, rather than to base decisions on a prediction of the future.

An early literature review of problem structuring proposed grouping the texts reviewed into "four streams of thought" that describe some major differences between methods:

- the checklist stream, which is step-by-step technical problem solving (not problem structuring as it came to be defined in PSMs, so this stream does not apply to PSMs),
- the definition stream, which is primarily modeling of relationships between variables, as described by Ackoff and others,
- the science research stream which emphasizes doing field research and gathering quantitative data, and
- the people stream, which "regards the definition of problems as a function of people's perceptions" as described by Checkland, Eden, and others.

=== Compared to large group methods ===
Mingers and Rosenhead have noted that there are similarities and differences between PSMs and large group methods such as Future Search, Open Space Technology, and others. PSMs and large group methods both bring people together to talk about, and to share different perspectives on, a situation or state of affairs that some people want to change. However, PSMs always focus on creating a sufficiently rigorous conceptual model or cognitive map of the situation, whereas large group methods do not necessarily emphasize modeling, and PSMs are not necessarily used with large groups of people.

=== Compared to participatory rural appraisal ===
There is significant overlap or shared characteristics between PSMs and some of the techniques used in participatory rural appraisal (PRA). Mingers and Rosenhead pointed out that in situations where people have low literacy, the nonliterate (oral and visual) techniques developed in PRA would be a necessary complement to PSMs, and the approaches to modeling in PSMs could be (and have been) used by practitioners of PRA.

== Applications ==
In 2004, Mingers and Rosenhead published a literature review of papers that had been published in scholarly journals and that reported practical applications of PSMs. Their literature survey covered the period up to 1998, which was "relatively early in the development of interest in PSMs", and categorized 51 reported applications under the following application areas: general organizational applications; information systems; technology, resources, planning; health services; and general research. Examples of applications reported included: designing a parliamentary briefing system, modeling the San Francisco Zoo, developing a business strategy and information system strategy, planning livestock management in Nepal, regional planning in South Africa, modeling hospital outpatient services, and eliciting knowledge about pesticides.

== Technology and software ==
PSMs are a general methodology and are not necessarily dependent on electronic information technology, but PSMs do rely on some kind of shared display of the models that participants are developing. The shared display could be flip charts, a large whiteboard, Post-it notes on the meeting room walls, and/or a personal computer connected to a video projector. After PSMs have been used in a group work session, it is normal for a record of the session's display to be shared with participants and with other relevant people.

Software programs for supporting problem structuring include Banxia Decision Explorer and Group Explorer, which implement cognitive mapping for strategic options development and analysis (SODA), and Compendium, which implements IBIS for dialogue mapping and related methods; a similar program is called Wisdom. Such software can serve a variety of functions, such as simple technical assistance to the group facilitator during a single event, or more long-term online group decision support systems.

Some practitioners prefer not to use computers during group work sessions because of the effect they have on group dynamics, but such use of computers is standard in some PSMs such as SODA and dialogue mapping, in which computer display of models or maps is intended to guide conversation in the most efficient way.

In some situations additional software that is not used only for PSMs may be incorporated into the problem structuring process; examples include spreadsheet modeling, system dynamics software or geographic information systems. Some practitioners, who have focused on building system dynamics simulation models with groups of people, have called their work group model building (GMB) and have concluded "that GMB is another PSM". GMB has also been used in combination with SODA.

== See also ==
- Causal model
- Boundary critique
- Decision conferencing
- Delphi method
- Group concept mapping
- Inquiry § Inquiry in the pragmatic paradigm
- Method engineering
- Participatory modeling
- Policy § Policy cycle
- Problem finding
- Problem formulation
- Research question
- Richards Heuer § Structured analytic techniques
- Stakeholder analysis
