= Compendium (software) =

Social science computer program

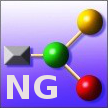

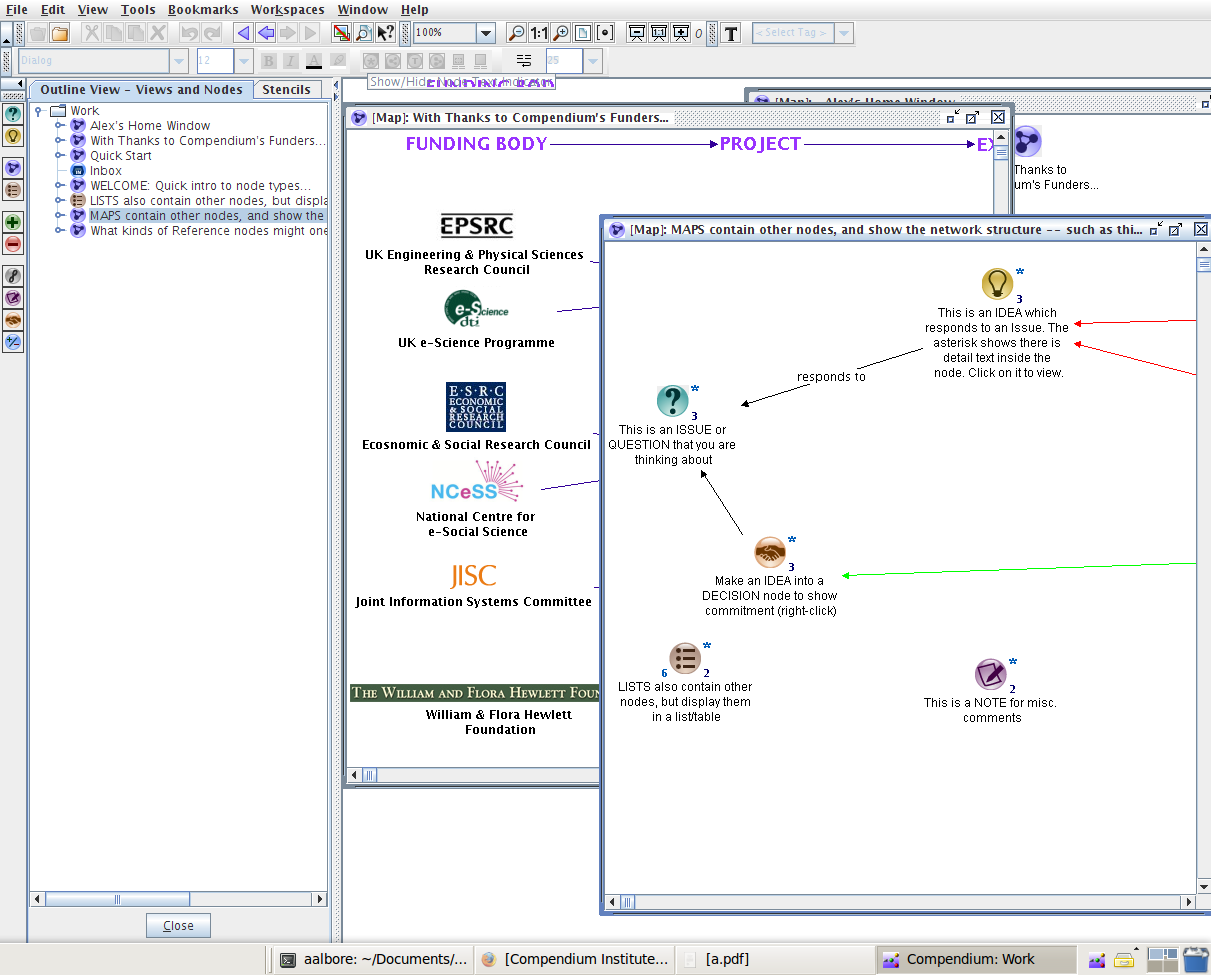
- Screenshot of v.1.5.2
- Developer: Compendium Institute
- Final release: 2.1.3 / 21 January 2014; 12 years ago
- Written in: Java
- Operating system: Cross-platform
- License: GNU LGPL
- Website: Official website
- Repository: github.com/compendiumng/compendiumng

Compendium is a computer program and social science tool that facilitates the mapping and management of ideas and arguments. The software provides a visual environment that allows people to structure and record collaboration as they discuss and work through wicked problems.

The software was released by the not-for-profit Compendium Institute. The current version operationalises the issue-based information system (IBIS), an argumentation mapping structure first developed by Horst Rittel in the 1970s. Compendium adds hypertext functionality and database interoperability to the issue-based notation derived from IBIS.

Compendium source code was fully released under the GNU Lesser General Public License on 13 January 2009. Compendium can still be downloaded, but is no longer actively maintained.

== Applications ==
Compendium diagrammatically represents thoughts as nodes displayed as labeled icons—with types such as issues/questions, ideas/answers, arguments, references, and decisions—and represents interconnections between different nodes. It can be used for applications as varied as: issue mapping in meetings, design rationales and requirements analysis, meeting management (agendas and minutes), action item and issue tracking, requirements management, classification, management templates, and reference databases (such as personal knowledge bases).

The software can be used by a group of people in a collaborative manner to document their collective ideas using visual diagrams. A group facilitation method called dialogue mapping is especially suited for use with Compendium.

Compendium templates for critical thinking can be used to create argument maps using the argumentation schemes developed by argumentation theory scholars such as Douglas N. Walton, Chris Reed, and Fabrizio Macagno. Argumentation schemes are pre-defined patterns of reasoning for analysing and constructing arguments; each scheme is accompanied by a list of critical questions that can be used to evaluate whether a particular argument is good or fallacious. By using these argumentation schemes, users of Compendium can examine claims in more detail to uncover their implicit logical substructure and improve the rigor and depth of discussions.

== Features ==
There are ten default types of node: question, answer, list view, map view, pro, con, note, decision, reference, argument. There are three types of relationship between nodes: associative, transclusive, categorical. Images can be placed directly into a view, assigned to a node, or assigned to the background picture. Features of Compendium include:

- Drag and drop documents and websites onto a map
- Complete freedom to arrange icons
- Keyword tagging
- Map and label the connections between concepts to illustrate links
- Create dialogue maps to display links between everyone's ideas in group projects
- Create argument maps collaboratively, editing each other's writing
- Create issue/problem templates
- Share learning pathways
- Organise large amounts of information
- Place resources in sequence to develop a learning path

Users can choose to use Compendium with either the Apache Derby (internal) or MySQL (external) relational database management system.

The software is networked and supports concurrency and different views when using MySQL.

== History ==
Compendium is the result of fifteen years of development in collaborative modeling, initiated in the mid-1990s by Al Selvin and Maarten Sierhuis at NYNEX Science & Technology; the theory behind the software hails from the 1970s, when IBIS was first conceptualised by Horst Rittel. Selvin and Sierhuis built on Jeff Conklin's earlier hypertext issue mapping software: gIBIS and QuestMap.

Many associations have thence contributed ideas to the development of Compendium. These institutions include Blue Oxen Associates, Center for Creative Leadership, Open University's Knowledge Media Institute, Verizon, CogNexus Institute, and Agent iSolutions. In 2012, the Compendium community established CompendiumNG to further advance and develop the software.

== See also ==
- Argument map
- Concept map
- Graph database
- Issue tree
- Knowledge base
- List of concept- and mind-mapping software
