= Research question =

Question that a research project sets out to answer

A research question is "a question that a research project sets out to answer". Choosing a research question is an essential element of both quantitative and qualitative research. Investigation will require data collection and analysis, and the methodology for this will vary widely. Good research questions seek to improve knowledge on an important topic, and are usually narrow and specific.

To form a research question, one must determine what type of study will be conducted, such as a qualitative, quantitative, or mixed study. Additional factors, such as project funding, may not only affect the research question itself but also when and how it is formed during the research process. Literature suggests several variations on criteria selection for constructing a research question, such as the FINER or PICOT methods.

== Definition ==
The answer to a research question will help address a research problem or question. Specifying a research question, "the central issue to be resolved by a formal dissertation, thesis, or research project," is typically one of the first steps an investigator takes when undertaking research. Considerations, such as project funding or methodological approaches may influence the research process, including when and how the research question is developed. Clearly and accurately defining the research question can become an iterative process. In educational settings, research-question development can also be explicitly scaffolded through successive stages of topic narrowing, literature searching and synthesis, gap identification, feasibility assessment, and revision. Recent instructional approaches have incorporated generative AI into portions of this process while requiring students to independently verify AI-assisted reasoning against the scholarly literature. How the question is constructed can depend on the type of research or discipline.

== Constructing a research question ==
Specifying the research question is one of the first methodological steps the investigator has to take when undertaking research. Having an interest in or knowledge of a particular subject can be useful in the construction of a research question. Formation of the research question is largely determined by, and likewise influences, where and what kind of information will be sought. The research question must be accurately and clearly defined. Choosing a research question is the central element of both quantitative and qualitative research and in some cases it may precede construction of the conceptual framework of study; in all cases, it makes the theoretical assumptions in the framework more explicit and indicates what the researcher wants to know most and first. Therefore, the investigator must first identify the type of study (qualitative, quantitative, or mixed) before the research question is developed. Forming the research question may become an iterative process when parameters of the research process, such as field of study or methodology, do not fit the original question. Literature suggests several methods for selecting criteria in the development of a research question, two of which are the FINER and PICO methods.

=== Construction method examples ===
==== FINER criteria ====
The FINER method can be a useful tool for outlining research criteria used in the construction of a research question. Due to the flexibility of the criteria, this method may be used for a variety of research scenarios. The FINER method prompts researchers to determine whether one has the means and interest to conduct the study. It also asks one to consider the ethical ramifications, as well as the relevancy of the research.

According to Farrugia et al., the FINER criteria "highlight useful points that may increase the chances of developing a successful research project". These criteria were first suggested in the book Designing Clinical Research by Hulley et al., detailed below.

F – Feasible

- Adequate number of subjects
- Adequate technical expertise
- Affordable in time and money
- Manageable in scope

I – Interesting

- Getting the answer intrigues investigator, peers and community

N – Novel

- Confirms, refutes or extends previous findings

E – Ethical

- Amenable to a study that institutional review board will approve

R – Relevant

- To scientific knowledge
- To clinical and health policy
- To future research

==== PICOT criteria ====
PICOT criteria tend to be used to frame questions used in evidence-based studies, such as medical studies. Such research may focus on assessment or evaluation of patients or problems, as well as what may be the causal factor(s) with control and experimental groups.

P – Patient (or Problem)

I – Intervention (or Indicator)

C – Comparison group

O – Outcomes

T – Time

Continuing the research process, the investigator then carries out the research necessary to answer the research question, whether this involves reading secondary sources over a few days for an undergraduate term paper or carrying out primary research over years for a major project. When the research is complete and the researcher knows the (probable) answer to the research question, writing up can begin (as distinct from writing notes, which is a process that goes on through a research project). In term papers, the answer to the question is normally given in summary in the introduction in the form of a thesis statement.

== Aggregated research questions and coordination ==
Scientists often communicate open research questions. Sometimes such questions are crowdsourced and/or aggregated, sometimes supplemented with priorities or other details. A common way open research questions are identified, communicated, established/confirmed and prioritized are their inclusion in scientific reviews of a sub-field or specific research question, including in systematic reviews and meta-analyses. Other channels include reports by science journalists and dedicated (sub-)websites such as 80000hours.org's "research questions by discipline" or the Wikipedia articles of the lists of unsolved problems, aggregative/integrative studies, as well as unsolved online posts on Q&A websites and forums, sometimes categorized/marked as unsolved. There have been online surveys used to generate priority research topics which were then classified into broader themes. Such may improve research relevance and value or strengthen rationale for societal dedication of limited resources or expansions of the limited resources or for funding a specific study.

=== Prioritization and evaluations ===
In terms of priorities and related concepts, the proposed strategy of differential technological development suggests research to focus primarily on questions and tools that are thought to increase safety and mitigate issues rather than risky technologies which are instead best to delay. Concerning control strategies for gene drives, researchers have however cautioned that such may lead to a counterproductive false sense of security. Not all technological progress may be beneficial in general or in contemporary contexts (environments or systems) and various research may for example result in engineered pandemics.

Many studies "ask uninteresting research questions, [and] make only marginal contributions". One study suggests that while research on climate change "is valuable, it does not tackle head-on the most urgent question: how to change society to mitigate climate change right now". In the ethical framework of effective altruism, research questions with the greatest potential benefits from investments (not necessarily of financial nature) are identified to maximize research benefits. 80,000 Hours has compiled a small list of "Research questions that could have a big social impact, organised by discipline". In public health research, "it is vital that research questions posed are important and that funded research meets a research need or a gap in evidence".

=== ICTs, participation and routine procedures ===
Platforms, e.g. citizen science ones, can "support identification of problems, formulation of research questions, and study design". Participatory research can "improve study outcomes and foster greater data accessibility and utility as well as increase public transparency". Participants can have continued discussions and iterations regarding new questions. Research questions can be or are positioned at varying levels of detail – from broad to very specific questions – which are semantically or can be displayed as nested – for instance via category trees. In one platform, about invasion science and based on Wikidata, users "can zoom into the major research questions and hypotheses" of the field, "which are connected to the relevant studies published in the field and, if available, the underlying raw data" with tools like the Wikimedia project Scholia. Individuals "who can ask novel, field-altering questions" may vary from "those who can answer them" or vary per question. Translation of a (societal) problem "from its meaning in an everyday context into a scientifically valid research question means defining the goals of research in such a way that their contribution to practical solutions of a societal problem is narrow enough to be useful". Both everyday practical knowledge and scientific knowledge play a role in this process. In interdisciplinary research, integration "takes place at the level of the posing of research questions in the overlapping areas between various disciplines". There is research into enabling presenting scholarly knowledge "flexibly enriched with contextual information" for specific research questions.

Identification of open research questions may be useful for the adoption and application of science in society and accelerating specific research and development. There has been a suggestion for establishing a public non-profit organization that would identify "gaps in the science that need addressing", referring to the field of sustainable food system.

=== Examples and breadth of "research questions" ===
Similar to outlining open research questions, there have also been proposals to e.g. combine specific fields or sources of data and knowledge as the subject or method of new research or to engage more and more scientifically in specific research topics along with the establishment of new high-quality data gathering systems. One approach for the generation of research questions is [identifying, highlighting, and] challenging assumptions of existing theories and studies.

Sometimes research questions overlap with or also refer to challenges of a specific theory or field such as how to solve known problems with the Standard Model. Research issues and knowledge gaps can also overlap or be synonymous.

Examples of lists of open significant research questions in reviews include a list of "major outstanding questions" for (applied) human life extension, "fundamental" research questions in subterranean biology, open research questions for digital twins (across fields), open questions in performance measurement of sustainable supply chains, knowledge gaps in antimicrobial resistance, and unaddressed or neglected questions in the literature about 100% renewable energy systems.

== Types and purpose ==
The research question serves two purposes

1. It determines where and what kind of research the writer will be looking for.
2. It identifies the specific objectives the study or paper will address.

Therefore, the writer must first identify the type of study (qualitative, quantitative, or mixed) before the research question is developed.

=== Qualitative study ===
A qualitative study seeks to learn why or how, so the writer's research must be directed at determining the what, why and how of the research topic. Therefore, when crafting a research question for a qualitative study, the writer will need to ask a why or how question about the topic. For example: How did the company successfully market its new product? The sources needed for qualitative research typically include print and internet texts (written words), audio and visual media.

Here is Creswell's (2009) example of a script for a qualitative research central question:

- _________ (How or what) is the _________ ("story for" for narrative research; "meaning of" the phenomenon for phenomenology; "theory that explains the process of" for grounded theory; "culture-sharing pattern" for ethnography; "issue" in the "case" for case study) of _________ (central phenomenon) for _________ (participants) at _________ (research site).

=== Quantitative study ===
A quantitative study seeks to learn where, or when, so the writer's research must be directed at determining the where, or when of the research topic. Therefore, when crafting a research question for a quantitative study, the writer will need to ask a where, or when question about the topic. For example: Where should the company market its new product? Unlike a qualitative study, a quantitative study is mathematical analysis of the research topic, so the writer's research will consist of numbers and statistics.

Here is Creswell's (2009) example of a script for a quantitative research question:

- Does _________ (name the theory) explain the relationship between _________ (independent variable) and _________ (dependent variable), controlling for the effects of _________ (control variable)?

Alternatively, a script for a quantitative null hypothesis might be as follows:

- There is no significant difference between _________ (the control and experimental groups on the independent variable) on _________ (dependent variable).

Quantitative studies also fall into two categories:

1. Correlational studies: A correlational study is non-experimental, requiring the writer to research relationships without manipulating or randomly selecting the subjects of the research. The research question for a correlational study may look like this: What is the relationship between long-distance commuters and eating disorders?
2. Experimental studies: An experimental study is experimental in that it requires the writer to manipulate and randomly select the subjects of the research. The research question for an experimental study may look like this: Does the consumption of fast food lead to eating disorders?

=== Mixed study ===
A mixed study integrates both qualitative and quantitative studies, so the writer's research must be directed at determining the why or how and the what, where, or when of the research topic. Therefore, the writer will need to craft a research question for each study required for the assignment. A typical study may be expected to have between 1 and 6 research questions.

Once the writer has determined the type of study to be used and the specific objectives the paper will address, the writer must also consider whether the research question passes the "so what" test. The "so what" test means that the writer must construct evidence to convince the audience that the research is expected to add new or useful knowledge to the literature.

== Related terms ==
=== Problematique ===
Problematique is a term that functions analogously to the research problem or question used typically when addressing global systemic problems. The term achieved prominence in 1970 when Hasan Özbekhan, Erich Jantsch and Alexander Christakis conceptualized the original prospectus of the Club of Rome titled "The Predicament of Mankind". In this prospectus the authors designated 49 Continuous Critical Problems facing humankind, saying "We find it virtually impossible to view them as problems that exist in isolation – or as problems capable of being solved in their own terms... It is this generalized meta system of problems, which we call the 'problematique' that inheres in our situation."

Situations similar to the global problematique in their complexity are also called problematiques. These situations receive different designations from other authors. In organizational theory and related fields, researchers C. West Churchman, Horst Rittel and Melvin Webber, and Chris Argyris called these situations wicked problems; Russell Ackoff called them "messes".

== See also ==
- Bold hypothesis
- Design of experiments
- Hypothesis
- Inquiry
- Research design
- Problem finding
- Problem structuring methods
