= Shared vision planning =

Shared vision planning was developed by the U.S. Army Corps of Engineers during the National Drought Study (1989–1993). At the end of the Drought Study, Shared vision planning had three basic elements: (1) an updated version of the systems approach to water resources management developed during the Harvard Water Program; (2) an approach to public involvement called "Circles of Influence"; and (3) collaboratively built computer models of the system to be managed. Alternative dispute resolution methods are often used to bring people in conflict to the table, and to resolve differences that occur during planning. A method of collaborative decision making called "Informed consent" is used to make decisions internally consistent, more defensible and transparent.

== The three original basic elements ==
Each of the three original elements in shared vision planning has an evolutionary history leading to it. The Harvard Water Program planning approach (documented in a 1962 book, "Design of Water Resources Systems; New Techniques for Relating Economic Objectives, Engineering Analysis, and Governmental Planning") is the conceptual starting point for the first element, the planning method. Harvard's conceptual ideas were practiced and refined by a team led by Harry Schwarz in the North Atlantic Regional Study, a Federal water study instigated by President Lyndon B. Johnson after an historic drought in the Northeast led New York City to stop releasing water from its reservoirs into the Delaware River. President Johnson intervened because without that rush of freshwater flowing down the Delaware into the Atlantic Ocean, Atlantic salt water might have been introduced into the Philadelphia drinking water system. Schwarz later summarized the practical interpretation of the Harvard principles in "Large Scale Regional Water Resources Planning" which he wrote with David Major, a Harvard economist. The lessons learned in the North Atlantic Study were later encoded in the Federal "Principles and Standards for Planning Water and Related Land Resources" (1973) often shortened to "the P&S". The "P&S" were used in the design and justification of proposed federal water projects. Eugene Stakhiv, then head of the Corps policy studies, first suggested that a variation on the P&S should be used for drought response planning. During the National Drought Study, the Corps modified the P&S planning steps to make them more suitable for drought management decisions, which generally do not involve significant federal funding. These decisions typically must also be agreed to by multiple management entities, and there are typically multiple levels of government that control the drought response.

The "Circles of Influence" method of public involvement was developed by Robert Waldman during the National Drought Study and modified traditional Federal approaches. Typically, Federal water studies would invite stakeholders—people whose lives could be affected by the decision to build a project—to public meetings. Stakeholders might come to support and shape the infusion of Federal money into the region. But drought management studies typically do not determine whether federal money will be invested in a region; they determine water use curtailment and the storage and allocation of water supplies. Accordingly, "Circles of Influence" management agencies participate in forums already being used by stakeholders, such as city water advisory boards or boating groups. Trust is developed in concentric circles; the planner works to deserve the trust of the leaders other stakeholders already trust. Disputes that arise during planning are addressed using a range of alternative dispute resolution (ADR) methods. The Corps had been an early adapter of ADR, thanks to the work of Jerry Delli Priscoli. Delli Priscoli who worked at the Corps' Institute for Water Resources, where the National Drought Study was managed, was an informal advisor on the Drought Study. While there is still a link between the SVP community and the ADR community, it is largely personal, as the two communities are not served by a single professional society or journal.

The third element, the "shared vision model" was proposed by Richard Palmer during a National Drought Study case study meeting in Seattle, Washington in 1991. More than ten years earlier, Palmer had been doing post-doctorate work from Johns Hopkins University at the Interstate Commission on the Potomac River Basin (ICPRB). ICPRB was one of several government organizations developing reservoir projects to address water supply needs in the Washington Metropolitan area. Palmer proved using an optimization model that regional water needs could be met with only two new reservoirs if the water supply systems of Maryland, Northern Virginia and Washington were managed collaboratively, but because his model was a black box, his solution was not given a fair hearing. Palmer was aware of the use of interactive water models by Pete Loucks, a professor of engineering at Cornell University and he decided to build a simple interactive simulation model he called "PRISM" (Potomac River Interactive Simulation Model) and used it in a game playing exercise with water utility representatives. The exercise led to an historic agreement in 1981. Dan Sheer, who was working at ICPRB labeled this technique "computer aided negotiation" and has been using it since then in river basin studies around the world. Palmer introduced the concept to the National Drought Study team using a systems simulation model building software called STELLA, and the union of Palmer's modeling technique with the planning and public participation elements resulted in what is now known as shared vision planning.

== Elements developed through application since the Drought Study ==
In later applications, three more major elements developed and were added to Shared Vision Planning. The first is the concept of using Practice Decisions to achieve what Jerry Delli Priscoli calls "informed consent", which is similar to the medical concept in that expert and stakeholder consider each other's values, objectives and knowledge through a structured dialogue before mutually agreeing to a decision. Practice decisions are just that, decisions made publicly using preliminary data, model results and decision criteria. Practice decisions help decision makers refine and clarify all of these elements, even to arrange for new studies if it becomes clear that it will be needed because of new or more clearly articulated decision criteria. Practice decisions make the final decisions more transparent, and it gives stakeholders and experts an opportunity to present their arguments. The second major element is the use of decision scaling and scenario analysis to address uncertainty about future climate. Decision scaling was developed by Casey Brown, based on the idea that planners should determine whether any plausible future climate could cause failures to meet system objectives. Decision scaling applies more and more extreme climate conditions in system evaluations until the system fails. Future climate scenarios generated by GCMs, RCMs and other means can then be compared to the failure threshold to determine which plausible futures (if any) cause failures. Alternatives can then be developed to eliminate those failures while still performing well under more normal climate conditions. A robust alternative is one that performs about as well as any other alternative in any plausible future climate. The third major element is a more clearly articulated transition to adaptive management. Shared vision planning always required adaptive management and the use of virtual floods and droughts to keep decisions up to date. But during the application of shared vision planning on the International Joint Commission (IJC) International Upper Great Lakes study, institutional studies were conducted to develop an argument and procedure for adaptive management, and it became the strong recommendation of that Study Board. The IJC tested the adaptive management procedures in an experimental task force, then created the Great Lakes and St. Lawrence River Adaptive Management Committee to carry it out.

== Name ==
The method at first was called the "drought preparedness study method" but was renamed "Shared Vision Planning" at the suggestion of the late Brian Mar, a University of Washington colleague of Palmer who had heard the name applied to systems design at nearby Boeing Aerospace. Peter Senge used the shared vision phrase in his 1990 book on systems analysis, The Fifth Discipline and this may have been where Boeing learned it.

== Other case studies ==
Shared vision planning was used in five test studies during the National Drought Study; two were considered successful, the other three were not. Bill Werick, the National Drought Study leader later developed a set of "triage" questions to ask that would help determine whether shared vision planning would be helpful. Shared vision planning use was expanded beyond drought response planning immediately after the National Drought Study in the Alabama-Coosa-Tallapoosa—Apalachicola-Chattahoochee-Flint (ACT-ACF) Rivers conflict. Its application led to the first interstate water compact in the southeast, but the compact expired years later when the three governors of Florida, Georgia and Alabama could not agree on terms for its continuation. The method has been used in several case studies since, most recently by the International Joint Commission (IJC) in the Lake Ontario–St. Lawrence River Study (2000–2006), the Upper Great Lakes (2007–2012)., and the Rainy Lake study. The method has also been applied in Peru in support of some World Bank and Interamerican Development Bank water projects. The method was considered by academics and stakeholders in Sao Paulo during the recent drought, but, as predicted by the answers to the triage questions, it was rejected.

== Prospects for wider use ==
The use of the methods underlying shared vision planning is now more widespread than the name itself. Robert Costanza, the director of the Gund Institute for Ecological Economics, has used STELLA models in environmental and economic modeling since 1987.

The International Environmental Modelling and Software Society (iEMSs) has as its goal the development and use of environmental modelling and software tools to advance the science and improve decision making with respect to resource and environmental issues. Many iEMSs members have developed approaches similar to shared vision planning without any apparent awareness of the Corps' work, which is perhaps a testament to its soundness. "Mediated modeling" describes a systems based participatory modeling approach to environmental issues that is very similar to shared vision planning but has typically been used as a learning tool, especially for stakeholders who might otherwise be left out of public policy dialogues.

The Corps' Institute for Water Resources (IWR) managed the National Drought Study and now manages the Corps' shared vision planning activities. IWR, Sandia National Laboratories, and the United States Center for Environmental Conflict Resolution hosted the first national gathering of shared vision planners in Albuquerque, New Mexico in September 2007. A second conference was held in 2010 in Denver, Colorado. The conferences were part of the Computer Aided Dispute Resolution or CADRe program. Conference participants agreed that the basic methods of shared vision planning were slowly becoming part of the mainstream in water resources management but that the process could be accelerated if a common name and community identity could be applied to all the various permutations on the approach.

== See also ==
- Futures techniques
- International trade and water
- Problem structuring methods
- Spragg Bags
