= Return on time invested =

Productivity metric

Return on Time Invested (ROTI) is a subjective metric used to analyze the productivity and efficiency of time spent for a certain activity, project, or product made. Unlike return on investment (ROI), which calculates the financial capital gained, ROTI evaluates the value gained from time spent on an activity compared to the time invested in it. While the criteria for how worth was the time spent are subjective to different companies and organization, the main ones include information sharing, decision making, problem solving and work planning.

== Calculation ==
Specific calculation of ROTI can vary depending on the context, a general (Value of Outcomes / Time Invested) x 100 formula can be expressed as: ROTI = Total value or Output obtained / Total time invested.

=== After a meeting ===
Some organizations use the ROTI method to evaluate meetings and further improve them.

== Areas ==
=== Personal productivity ===
ROTI helps find more efficient ways to spend time on different activities that helps prioritize tasks that offer higher returns on time invested and minimizing time spent on low-value activities.

== See also ==
- Agile software development
- Cost–benefit analysis
- Feedback
- Meeting science
- Opportunity cost
- Pareto principle
- Personal development
- Time-use research
- Time value of money
