= Fresh water =

Naturally occurring water with low amounts of dissolved salts

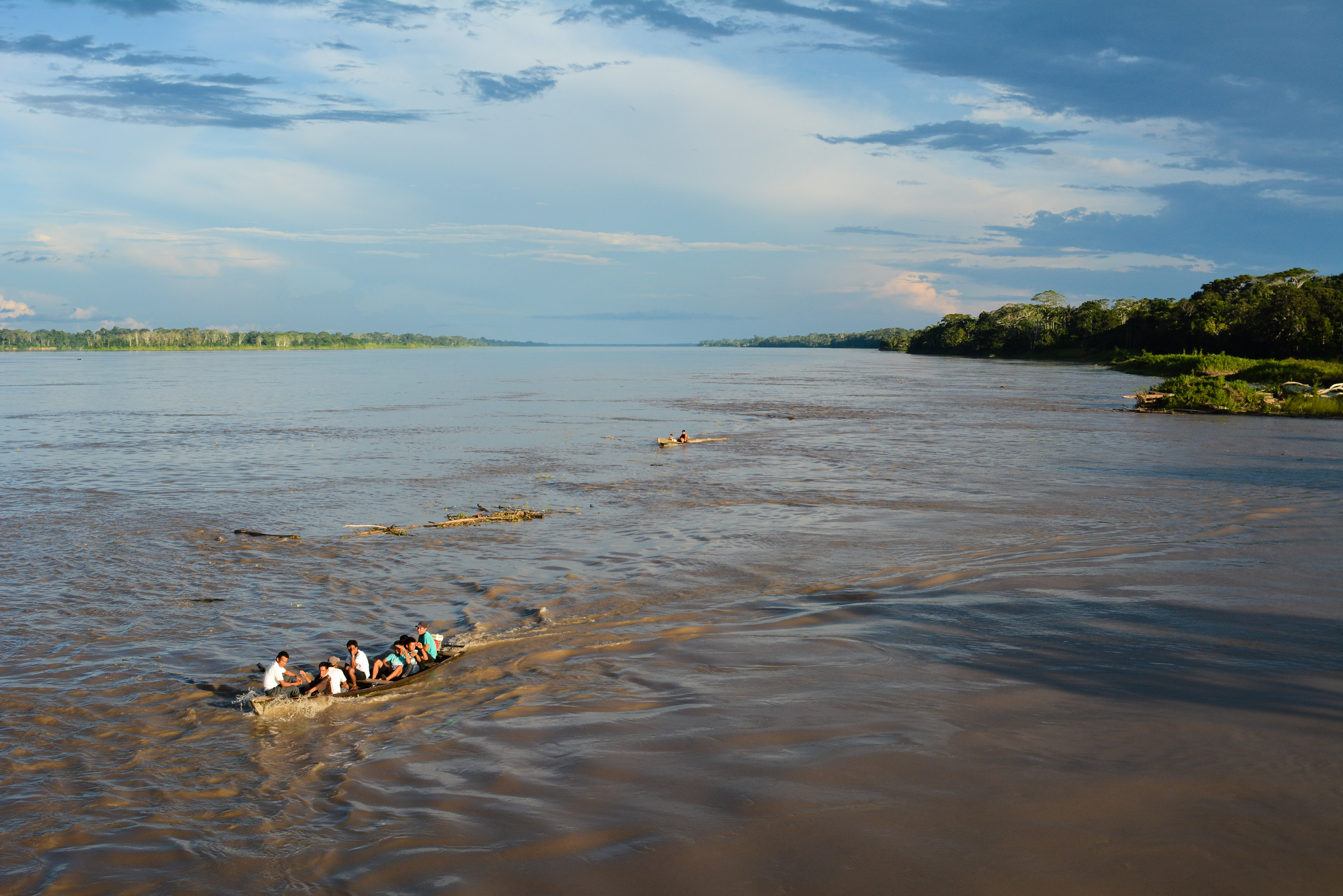
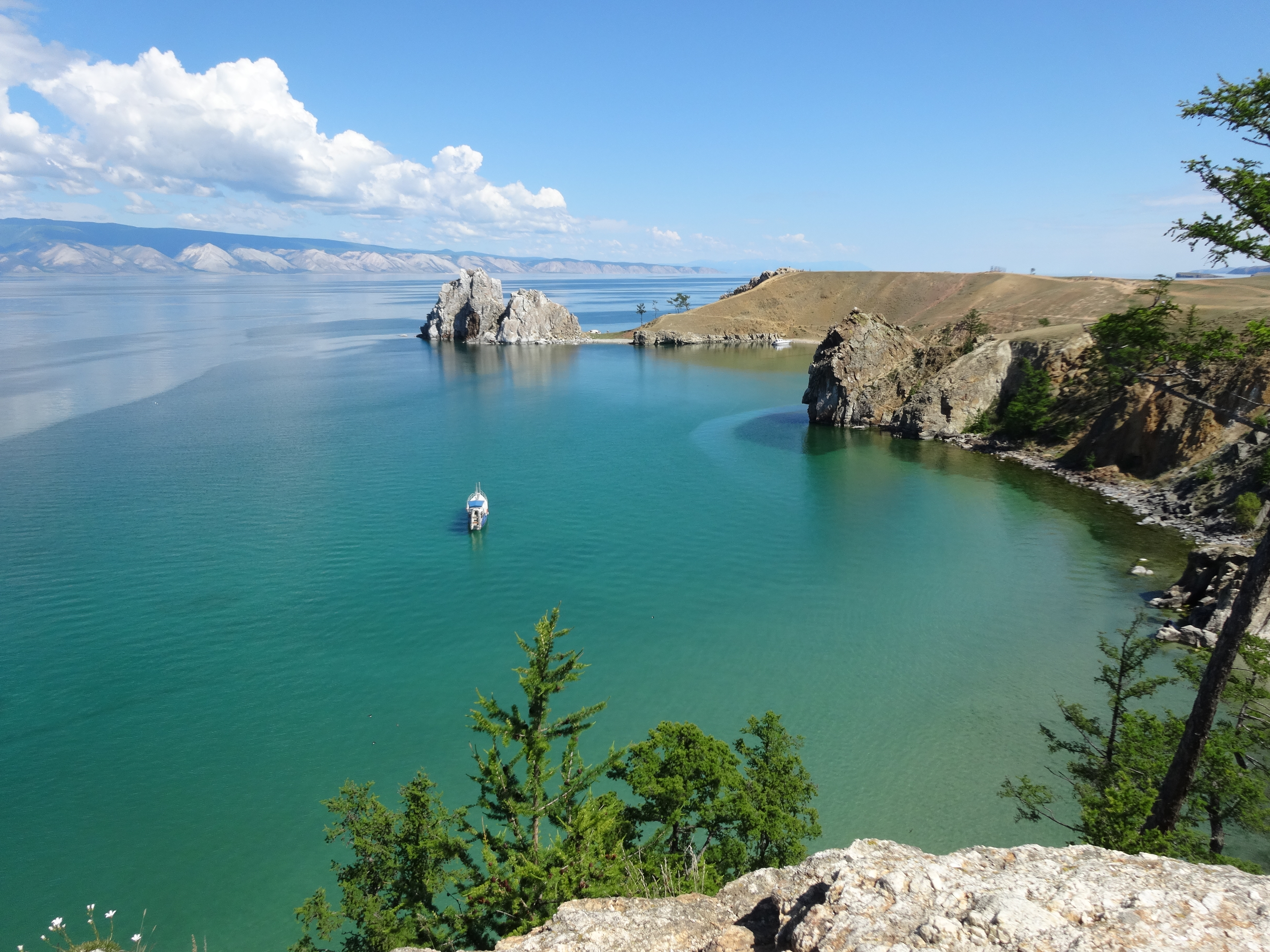
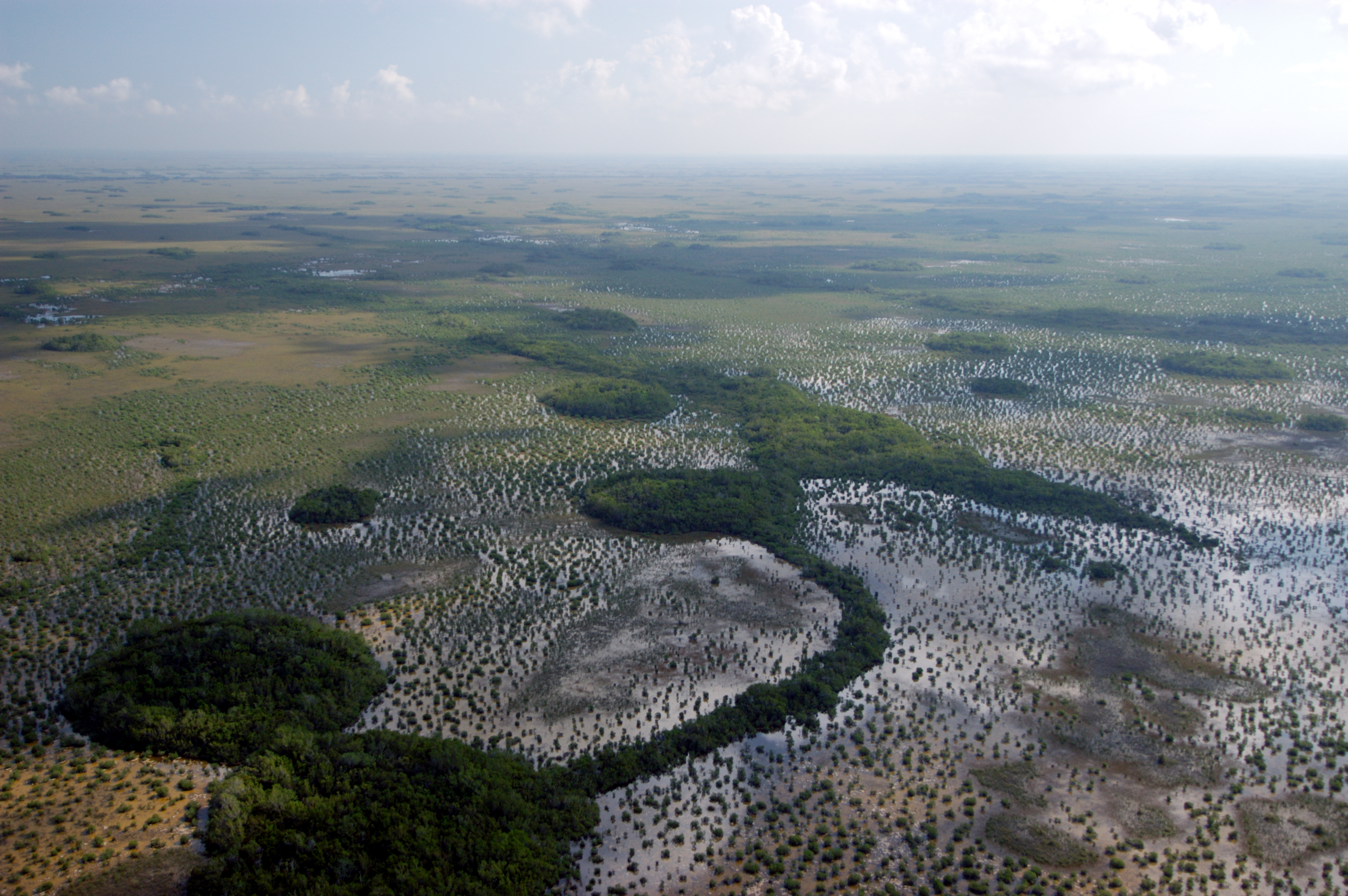
Rivers, lakes, and marshlands, such as (from top) South America's Amazon River, Russia's Lake Baikal, and the Everglades in Florida of the United States, are types of freshwater systems.

Fresh water or freshwater is any naturally occurring liquid or frozen water containing low concentrations of dissolved salts and other total dissolved solids. The term excludes seawater and brackish water, but it does include non-salty mineral-rich waters, such as chalybeate springs. Fresh water may encompass frozen and meltwater in ice sheets, ice caps, glaciers, snowfields and icebergs, natural precipitations such as rainfall, snowfall, hail/sleet and graupel, and surface runoffs that form inland bodies of water such as wetlands, ponds, lakes, rivers, streams, as well as groundwater contained in aquifers, subterranean rivers and lakes.

Water is critical to the survival of all living organisms. Many organisms can thrive on salt water, but the great majority of vascular plants and most insects, amphibians, reptiles, mammals and birds need fresh water to survive.

Fresh water is the water resource that is of the most and immediate use to humans. Fresh water is not always potable water, that is, water safe to drink by humans. Much of the earth's fresh water (on the surface and groundwater) is to a substantial degree unsuitable for human consumption without treatment. Fresh water can easily become polluted by human activities or due to naturally occurring processes, such as erosion.

Fresh water makes up about 2.5% of the world's water resources, and 1% of that is available for our use. About 68.7% of all fresh water is frozen in Antarctica. Just 3% is used by us. We also get fresh water from underground lakes (aquifers), this is known as groundwater, which is what makes up 30.1% of freshwater is found. Surface water only makes up about 1.2% of freshwater. Agriculture uses up around two thirds of all fresh water extracted from the environment.

Fresh water is a renewable and variable, but finite natural resource. Fresh water is replenished through the process of the natural water cycle, in which water from seas, lakes, forests, land, rivers and reservoirs evaporates, forms clouds, and returns inland as rain. Locally, however, if more fresh water is consumed through human activities than is naturally restored, this may result in less fresh water availability (water scarcity) from surface and underground sources and can cause serious damage to surrounding and associated environments. Water pollution also reduces the availability of fresh water. Where available water resources are scarce, humans have developed technologies like desalination and wastewater recycling to stretch the available supply further. However, given the high cost (both capital and running costs) and - especially for desalination - energy requirements, those remain mostly niche applications.

A non-sustainable alternative is using so-called "fossil water" from underground aquifers. As some of those aquifers formed hundreds of thousands or even millions of years ago when local climates were wetter (e.g. from one of the Green Sahara periods) and are not appreciably replenished under current climatic conditions - at least compared to drawdown, these aquifers form essentially non-renewable resources comparable to peat or lignite, which are also continuously formed in the current era but orders of magnitude slower than they are mined.

== Definitions ==
=== Numerical definition ===
Fresh water can be defined as water with less than 500 parts per million (ppm) of dissolved salts.

Other sources give higher upper salinity limits for fresh water, e.g. 1,000 ppm or 3,000 ppm.

=== Systems ===
Freshwater habitats are classified as either lentic systems, which are the stillwaters including ponds, lakes, swamps and mires; lotic which are running-water systems; or groundwaters which flow in rocks and aquifers. There is, in addition, a zone which bridges between groundwater and lotic systems, which is the hyporheic zone, which underlies many larger rivers and can contain substantially more water than is seen in the open channel. It may also be in direct contact with the underlying underground water.

== Sources ==
The original source of almost all fresh water is precipitation from the atmosphere, in the form of mist, rain and snow. Fresh water falling as mist, rain or snow contains materials dissolved from the atmosphere and material from the sea and land over which the rain bearing clouds have traveled. The precipitation leads eventually to the formation of water bodies that humans can use as sources of freshwater: ponds, lakes, rainfall, rivers, streams, and groundwater contained in underground aquifers.

In coastal areas fresh water may contain significant concentrations of salts derived from the sea if windy conditions have lifted drops of seawater into the rain-bearing clouds. This can give rise to elevated concentrations of sodium, chloride, magnesium and sulfate as well as many other compounds in smaller concentrations.

In desert areas, or areas with impoverished or dusty soils, rain-bearing winds can pick up sand and dust and this can be deposited elsewhere in precipitation and causing the freshwater flow to be measurably contaminated both by insoluble solids but also by the soluble components of those soils. Significant quantities of iron may be transported in this way including the well-documented transfer of iron-rich rainfall falling in Brazil derived from sand-storms in the Sahara in north Africa.

In Africa, it was revealed that groundwater controls are complex and do not correspond directly to a single factor. Groundwater showed greater resilience to climate change than expected, and areas with an increasing threshold between 0.34 and 0.39 aridity index exhibited significant sensitivity to climate change. Land-use could affect infiltration and runoff processes. The years of most recharge coincided with the most precipitation anomalies, such as during El Niño and La Niña events. Three precipitation-recharge sensitivities were distinguished: in super arid areas with more than 0.67 aridity index, there was constant recharge with little variation with precipitation; in most sites (arid, semi-arid, humid), annual recharge increased as annual precipitation remained above a certain threshold; and in complex areas down to 0.1 aridity index (focused recharge), there was very inconsistent recharge (low precipitation but high recharge). Understanding these relationships can lead to the development of sustainable strategies for water collection. This understanding is particularly crucial in Africa, where water resources are often scarce and climate change poses significant challenges.

== Water distribution ==
Visualisation of the distribution (by volume) of water on Earth (Note: Every one of the million tiny cubes (such as the one representing biological water) corresponds to approximately 1400 cubic km of water, with a mass of approximately 1.4 trillion tonnes (235000 times that of the Great Pyramid of Giza or 8 times that of Lake Kariba, arguably the heaviest human-made object).)

A graphical distribution of the locations of water on Earth (Note: Only 3% of the Earth's water is fresh water. Most of it is in icecaps and glaciers (69%) and groundwater (30%), while all lakes, rivers and swamps combined only account for a small fraction (0.3%) of the Earth's total freshwater reserves.)

Saline water in oceans, seas and saline groundwater make up about 97% of all the water on Earth. Only 2.5–2.75% is fresh water, including 1.75–2% frozen in glaciers, ice and snow, 0.5–0.75% as fresh groundwater. The water table is the level below which all spaces are filled with water, while the area above this level, where spaces in the rock and soil contain both air and water, is known as the unsaturated zone. The water in this unsaturated zone is referred to as soil moisture.

Below the water table, the entire region is known as the saturated zone, and the water in this zone is called groundwater. Groundwater plays a crucial role as the primary source of water for various purposes including drinking, washing, farming, and manufacturing, and even when not directly used as a drinking water supply it remains vital to protect due to its ability to carry contaminants and pollutants from the land into lakes and rivers, which constitute a significant percentage of other people's freshwater supply. It is almost ubiquitous underground, residing in the spaces between particles of rock and soil or within crevices and cracks in rock, typically within 100 m (330 ft) of the surface, and soil moisture, and less than 0.01% of it as surface water in lakes, swamps and rivers.

Freshwater lakes contain about 87% of this fresh surface water, including 29% in the African Great Lakes, 22% in Lake Baikal in Russia, 21% in the North American Great Lakes, and 14% in other lakes. Swamps have most of the balance with only a small amount in rivers, most notably the Amazon River. The atmosphere contains 0.04% water. In areas with no fresh water on the ground surface, fresh water derived from precipitation may, because of its lower density, overlie saline ground water in lenses or layers. Most of the world's fresh water is frozen in ice sheets. Many areas have very little fresh water, such as deserts.

== Freshwater ecosystems ==
Water is a critical issue for the survival of all living organisms. Some can use salt water but many organisms including the great majority of higher plants and most mammals must have access to fresh water to live. Some terrestrial mammals, especially desert rodents, appear to survive without drinking, but they do generate water through the metabolism of cereal seeds, and they also have mechanisms to conserve water to the maximum degree.

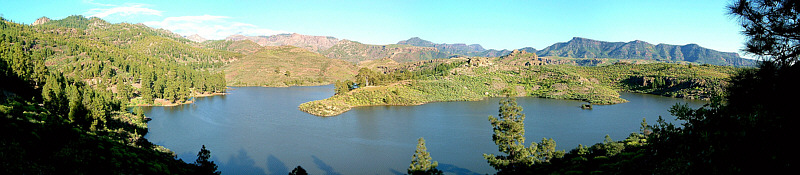
Freshwater ecosystem

Freshwater ecosystems are a subset of Earth's aquatic ecosystems that include the biological communities inhabiting freshwater waterbodies such as lakes, ponds, rivers, streams, springs, bogs, and wetlands. They can be contrasted with marine ecosystems, which have a much higher salinity. Freshwater habitats can be classified by different factors, including temperature, light penetration, nutrients, and vegetation.

There are three basic types of freshwater ecosystems: lentic (slow moving water, including pools, ponds, and lakes), lotic (faster moving streams, for example creeks and rivers) and wetlands (semi-aquatic areas where the soil is saturated or inundated for at least part of the time). Freshwater ecosystems contain 41% of the world's known fish species.

== Challenges ==
The increase in the world population and the increase in per capita water use puts increasing strains on the finite resources availability of clean fresh water. The response by freshwater ecosystems to a changing climate can be described in terms of three interrelated components: water quality, water quantity or volume, and water timing. A change in one often leads to shifts in the others as well.

=== Limited resource ===
Water scarcity (closely related to water stress or water crisis) is the lack of any, local or economically viably transportable, sources of fresh water resources to meet the standard water demand in a region. There are two types of water scarcity. One is physical. The other is economic water scarcity. Physical water scarcity is where there is not enough water to meet all demands. This includes water needed for ecosystems to function. Regions with a desert climate often face physical water scarcity. Central Asia, West Asia, North Africa, and most of Australia are examples of arid areas. Economic water scarcity results from a lack of investment in infrastructure or technology to draw usable water from rivers, aquifers, and other water sources. It also results from weak human capacity to meet water demand. Many people in sub-Saharan Africa are living with economic water scarcity.

There is and has always been enough physical supply of freshwater for current or near or distant future demand in a global scale. As such, water scarcity is caused by a mismatch between when and where people need water, and when and where it is available. This can happen due to an increase in the number of people in a region, changing living conditions and diets, and expansion of irrigated agriculture. Climate change (including droughts or floods), deforestation, water pollution and wasteful use of water can also mean there is not enough water. These variations in scarcity may also be a function of prevailing economic policy and planning approaches.

=== Minimum streamflow ===
An important concern for hydrological ecosystems is securing minimum streamflow, especially preserving and restoring instream water allocations. Fresh water is an important natural resource necessary for the survival of all ecosystems.

=== Water pollution ===
Water pollution (or aquatic pollution) is the contamination of water bodies, which has a negative impact on how they can be used. It is usually caused by human activities. Water bodies include lakes, rivers, oceans, aquifers, reservoirs and groundwater. Water pollution results when contaminants mix with these water bodies. Contaminants can come from one of four main sources. These are sewage discharges, industrial activities, agricultural activities, and urban runoff including stormwater. Water pollution may affect either surface water or groundwater. This form of pollution can lead to many problems. One is the degradation of aquatic ecosystems. Another is spreading water-borne diseases when people use polluted water for drinking or irrigation. Water pollution also reduces the ecosystem services such as drinking water provided by the water resource.

Sources of water pollution are either point sources or non-point sources. Point sources have one identifiable cause, such as a storm drain, a wastewater treatment plant, or an oil spill. Non-point sources are more diffuse. An example is agricultural runoff. Pollution is the result of the cumulative effect over time. Pollution may take many forms. One would be toxic substances such as oil, metals, plastics, pesticides, persistent organic pollutants, and industrial waste products. Another is stressful conditions such as changes of pH, hypoxia or anoxia, increased temperatures, excessive turbidity, or changes of salinity). The introduction of pathogenic organisms is another. Contaminants may include organic and inorganic substances. A common cause of thermal pollution is the use of water as a coolant by power plants and industrial manufacturers.

== Society and culture ==
Annual freshwater withdrawals

=== Human uses ===
Uses of water include agricultural, industrial, household, recreational and environmental activities.

=== Global goals for conservation ===
The Sustainable Development Goals are a collection of 17 interlinked global goals designed to be a "blueprint to achieve a better and more sustainable future for all". Targets on fresh water conservation are included in SDG 6 (Clean water and sanitation) and SDG 15 (Life on land). For example, Target 6.4 is formulated as "By 2030, substantially increase water-use efficiency across all sectors and ensure sustainable withdrawals and supply of freshwater to address water scarcity and substantially reduce the number of people suffering from water scarcity." Another target, Target 15.1, is: "By 2020, ensure the conservation, restoration and sustainable use of terrestrial and inland freshwater ecosystems and their services, in particular forests, wetlands, mountains and drylands, in line with obligations under international agreements."

== See also ==
- Limnology – Science of inland aquatic ecosystems
- Properties of water – Physical and chemical properties of pure water
