= Problem finding =

Problem discovery

Problem finding is the act of problem solving in which intellectual vision and insight are used into what is missing. Problem finding plays a major role in application of creativity.

Different terms have been used for problem finding in literature including problem discovery, problem formulation, problem identification, problem construction, and problem posing. It has been studied in many fields. Mathematics and science prefer to the term problem posing.

== Processes in problem finding ==
Basadur distinguished problem discovery and problem formulation; then later problem generation and problem conceptualization. Runco and Chand distinguish problem identification and problem definition.

Scholars distinguish between well-defined and ill-defined problems. Briggs and Reinig defined a well-defined solution in terms of space solution space. Pretz, Naples, and Sternberg defined a well-defined problem as one for which the parts of the solution are closely related or clearly based on the information given. Problem finding applies to ill-defined problems.

Abdulla-Alabbasi and Cramond reviewing the literature on problem finding conceptualize five processes of decreasing of ill-definedness and distinguish ideative and evaluative processes. The processes are discovery, formulation, construction, identification and definition. Problem discovery is an unconscious process which depends upon knowledge whereby an idea enters one's conscious awareness, problem formulation is the discovery of a goal; problem construction involves modifying a known problem or goal to another one; problem identification represents a problem that exists in reality but needs to be discovered (such as an unknown virus causing illness in patients); problem definition involves modifying a problem but in a mostly evaluative rather than ideative way.

== See also ==
- Adaptive reasoning
- Abductive reasoning
- Analogy
- Artificial intelligence
- Brainstorming
- Common sense
- Common sense reasoning
- Creative problem solving
- Cyc
- Deductive reasoning
- Divergent thinking
- Educational psychology
- Executive function
- Facilitation (business)
- General Problem Solver
- Inductive reasoning
- Innovation
- Intelligence amplification
- Inquiry
- Morphological analysis (problem-solving)
- Newell, Allen
- PDCA
- Problem statement
- Problem structuring methods
- Research question
- Simon, Herbert
- Soar (cognitive architecture)
- Thought
- Transdisciplinarity
- TRIZ
- Troubleshooting
- Wicked problem
