= Policy and Society =

Academic journal

- Discipline: Policy studies
- Language: English
- Edited by: Giliberto Capano; Michael P. Howlett; Darryl S.L. Jarvis; M. Ramesh

Publication details
- Former names: Policy, Organisation and Society
- History: 1981–present
- Publisher: Taylor & Francis
- Frequency: Quarterly
- Open access: Yes
- Impact factor: 1.983 (2018)

Standard abbreviations
- ISO 4: Policy Soc.

Indexing
- ISSN: 1449-4035 (print); 1839-3373 (web)
- LCCN: 2009205416
- OCLC no.: 834913646

Links
- Journal homepage; Online access; Online archive

Policy and Society is a quarterly peer-reviewed open access academic journal covering policy studies. It was established in 1981 as Policy, Organisation and Society, obtaining its current name in 2003. It is published by Taylor & Francis and the editors-in-chief are Giliberto Capano (Università di Bologna), Michael Howlett (Simon Fraser University), Darryl S.L. Jarvis (Education University of Hong Kong), and M. Ramesh (National University of Singapore). According to the Journal Citation Reports, the journal has a 2018 impact factor of 1.983.
