= Decision conferencing =

Decision conferencing is a common approach in decision analysis. It is a socio-technical process to engage key players in solving an issue of concern by (1) developing a shared understanding of the issue, (2) creating a sense of common purpose, and (3) generating a commitment to the way forward. It consists in a series of working meetings, called 'decision conferences'. During a decision conference an impartial facilitator helps participants in developing a formal model of the problem on-the-go.

== History ==
The idea of decision conferencing is attributed to Cameron Peterson and his colleagues at the Decision & Design Inc. in the late 1970s, which was then developed by the Decision Analysis Unit of the London School of Economics and Political Science led by Lawrence D. Phillips.

== Methodology ==
Socio-technical approaches derive from the seminal work of Eric Trist and Fred Emery, who studied the interaction between people and technology in the work environment.

The technical element of decision conferencing typically consists in the development of a multiple criteria decision analysis model to represent the multiplicity of conflicting objectives involved in a decision.

The social aspect of decision conferencing draws from the literature on group decision processes. Some of this research shows that groups rarely outperform their most knowledgeable members, unless the interaction is mediated by impartial facilitation, decision modelling and information technology.

Some authors argue that the key process taking place in decision conferencing is the behavioral aggregation of expert judgments.

Other authors embed decision conferencing in the larger family of 'facilitated decision modelling' approaches originated in operations research.

== Notable applications ==
Some notable applications of decision conferencing are:

- recommending options for radioactive waste disposal in the UK by the Committee of Radioactive Waste Management (CoRWM)
- priority setting in healthcare planning
- setting a strategic vision for Pernambuco, Brazil
- prioritizing public investments in social infrastructures

== See also ==
- Problem structuring methods
