= Issue-based information system =

Argumentation scheme

The issue-based information system (IBIS) is an argumentation-based approach to clarifying wicked problems—complex, ill-defined problems that involve multiple stakeholders. Diagrammatic visualization using IBIS notation is often called issue mapping.

IBIS was invented by Werner Kunz and Horst Rittel in the 1960s. According to Kunz and Rittel, "Issue-Based Information Systems (IBIS) are meant to support coordination and planning of political decision processes. IBIS guides the identification, and settling of issues raised by problem-solving groups, and provides information pertinent to the discourse."

Subsequently, the understanding of planning and design as a process of argumentation (of the designer with himself or with others) has led to the use of IBIS in design rationale, where IBIS notation is one of a number of different kinds of rationale notation. The simplicity of IBIS notation, and its focus on questions, makes it especially suited for representing conversations during the early exploratory phase of problem solving, when a problem is relatively ill-defined.

The basic structure of IBIS is a graph. It is therefore quite suitable to be manipulated by computer, as in a graph database.

== Overview ==
The elements of IBIS are: issues (questions that need to be answered), each of which are associated with (answered by) alternative positions (possible answers or ideas), which are associated with arguments which support or object to a given position; arguments that support a position are called "pros", and arguments that object to a position are called "cons". In the course of the treatment of issues, new issues come up which are treated likewise.

IBIS as typically used has three basic elements (or kinds of nodes, labeled "issue", "position", "argument") and a limited set of ways that the nodes may be connected. Issues (questions) can be associated with any node. Positions (answers) can be associated only with issues. Arguments can be associated with positions but not with questions.

IBIS elements are usually represented as nodes, and the associations between elements are represented as directed edges (arrows).

In 1988, Douglas E. Noble and Horst Rittel described the overall purpose of IBIS as follows:

Issue-Based Information Systems are used as a means of widening the coverage of a problem. By encouraging a greater degree of participation, particularly in the earlier phases of the process, the designer is increasing the opportunity that difficulties of his proposed solution, unseen by him, will be discovered by others. Since the problem observed by a designer can always be treated as merely a symptom of another higher-level problem, the argumentative approach also increases the likelihood that someone will attempt to attack the problem from this point of view. Another desirable characteristic of the Issue-Based Information System is that it helps to make the design process 'transparent'. Transparency here refers to the ability of observers as well as participants to trace back the process of decision-making.

IBIS notation has been used, along with function analysis diagram (FAD) notation, as an aid for root cause analysis.

== Issue mapping ==
This graph shows a simple issue-mapping example using IBIS notation with icons. Many other configurations are possible within the restrictions of IBIS rhetorical rules, and issue maps can expand indefinitely.

IBIS notation is used in issue mapping, an argument visualization technique closely related to argument mapping. An issue map aims to comprehensively diagram the rhetorical structure of a conversation (or a series of conversations) as seen by the participants in the conversation, as opposed to an ideal conceptual structure such as, for example, a causal loop diagram, flowchart, or structure chart.

=== Dialogue mapping ===
Issue mapping is the basis of a meeting facilitation technique called dialogue mapping. In dialogue mapping, a person called a facilitator uses IBIS notation to record a group conversation, while it is happening, on a "shared display" (usually a video projector). The facilitator listens to the conversation, and summarizes the ideas mentioned in the conversation on the shared display using IBIS notation, and if possible "validates" the map often by checking with the group to make sure each recorded element accurately represents the group's thinking. Dialogue mapping, like a few other facilitation methods, has been called "nondirective" because it does not require participants or leaders to agree on an agenda or a problem definition. Users of dialogue mapping have reported that dialogue mapping, under certain conditions, can improve the efficiency of meetings by reducing unnecessary redundancy and digressions in conversations, among other benefits.

A dialogue map does not aim to be as formal as, for example, a logic diagram or decision tree, but rather aims to be a comprehensive display of all the ideas that people shared during a conversation. Other decision algorithms can be applied to a dialogue map after it has been created, although dialogue mapping is also well suited to situations that are too complex and context-dependent for an algorithmic approach to decision-making. Some researchers and practitioners have combined IBIS with numerical decision-making software based on multi-criteria decision making.

== History ==
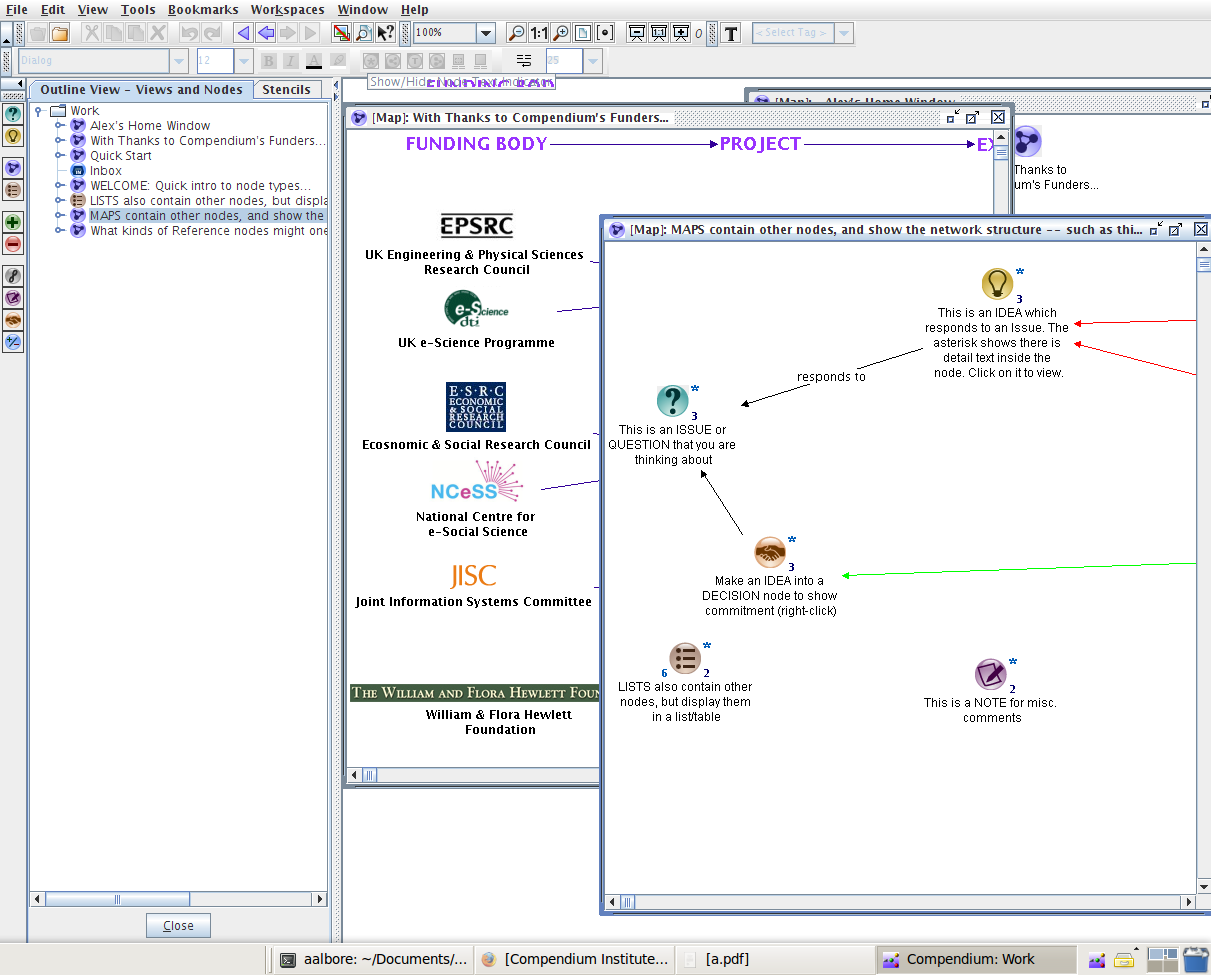
Graphical IBIS in Compendium (software)

Rittel's interest lay in the area of public policy and planning, which is also the context in which he and his colleagues defined wicked problems. So it is no surprise that Kunz and Rittel envisaged IBIS as the "type of information system meant to support the work of cooperatives like governmental or administrative agencies or committees, planning groups, etc., that are confronted with a problem complex in order to arrive at a plan for decision".

When Kunz and Rittel's paper was written, there were three manual, paper-based IBIS-type systems in use—two in government agencies and one in a university.

A renewed interest in IBIS-type systems came about in the following decade, when advances in technology made it possible to design relatively inexpensive, computer-based IBIS-type systems. By 1983, Raymond McCall and colleagues had implemented a version of IBIS called PHIBIS (procedurally hierarchical IBIS) in personal computer software called MIKROPLIS (microcomputer-based planning and information system), which was described as an information system for "professional problem solvers—including planners, designers and scientists". In 1987, Douglas E. Noble completed a computer-supported IBIS program as part of his doctoral dissertation. Another IBIS computer program developed in the late 1980s was called HyperIBIS. Jeff Conklin and co-workers adapted the IBIS structure for use in software engineering, creating the gIBIS (graphical IBIS) hypertext system in the late 1980s. Around 1990, a program called Author's Argumentation Assistant (AAA) combined the PHIBIS model with the Toulmin model of argumentation in "a hypertext-based authoring tool for argumentative texts". In the 1990s, architecture researchers experimented with enhancing IBIS with a fuzzy reasoning system.

Several other graphical IBIS-type systems were developed once it was realised that such systems facilitated collaborative design and problem solving. These efforts culminated in the creation of the open source Compendium (software) tool which supports—among other things—a graphical IBIS notation. Another IBIS tool that integrates with Microsoft SharePoint is called Glyma. Similar tools which do not rely on a database for storage include DRed (Design Rationale editor) and designVUE.

Since the mid-2000s, there has been a renewed interest in IBIS-type systems, particularly in the context of sensemaking and collaborative problem solving in a variety of social and technical contexts. Of particular note is the facilitation method called dialogue mapping which uses the IBIS notation to map out a design (or any other) dialogue as it evolves.

In 2021, researchers reported that IBIS notation is used in D-Agree, a discussion support platform with artificial intelligence–based facilitation. The discussion trees in D-Agree, inspired by IBIS, contain a combination of four types of elements: issues, ideas, pros, and cons. The software extracts a discussion's structure in real time based on IBIS, automatically classifying all the sentences.

== See also ==
- Collaborative software – Type of application software
- Computational sociology – Branch of the discipline of sociology
- Creative problem solving – Mental process of problem solving
- Critical thinking – Analysis of facts to form a judgment
- Deliberation – Process of thoughtfully weighing options, usually prior to voting
- Dialogue – Conversation between two or more people
- Inquiry § Inquiry in the pragmatic paradigm
- Issue tree – Graphical breakdown for problem solving
- Knowledge base – Information repository with multiple applications
- Personal knowledge base – Knowledge management software
- Socratic questioning – Type of question to predict knowledge on topic
- Why–because analysis – Method for accident analysis to determine causal relationships
