= Participatory modeling =

Participatory modeling is a purposeful learning process for action that engages the implicit and explicit knowledge of stakeholders to create formalized and shared representation(s) of reality. In this process, the participants co-formulate the problem and use modeling practices to aid in the description, solution, and decision-making actions of the group. Participatory modeling is often used in environmental and resource management contexts. It can be described as engaging non-scientists in the scientific process. The participants structure the problem, describe the system, and create a shared understanding of how the system works. This can further lead to more quantitative analyses, and may sometimes result in a computer model of the system, which is then jointly used to test policy interventions, and propose one or more solutions. Participatory modeling is often used in natural resources management, such as forests or water.

There are numerous benefits from this type of modeling, including a high degree of ownership and motivation towards change for the people involved in the modeling process. It also helps to develop more acceptable solutions and often creates more consensus among the stakeholders involved.

== See also ==
- Model-driven architecture
- Participatory design
- Participatory GIS
- Public participation GIS
- Problem structuring methods
- Shared vision planning
- SEQUAL framework
