= Journal of Business and Psychology =

- Discipline: Industrial and Organizational Psychology, Organizational Behavior, Human Resources Management
- Language: English
- Edited by: Steven Rogelberg

Publication details
- History: 1986-present
- Publisher: Springer Science+Business Media
- Frequency: Quarterly
- Impact factor: 6.760 (2020)

Standard abbreviations
- ISO 4: J. Bus. Psychol.

Indexing
- ISSN: 0889-3268 (print); 1573-353X (web)
- LCCN: sf93092356
- JSTOR: 08893268
- OCLC no.: 13847167

Links
- Journal homepage; Online access

The Journal of Business and Psychology is a peer-reviewed academic journal covering research in organizational science. It publishes papers from industrial and organizational psychology, organizational behavior, human resources management, work psychology, occupational psychology, and vocational psychology. It was established in 1986 and is published quarterly by Springer Science+Business Media. The editor-in-chief is Steven G. Rogelberg (University of North Carolina at Charlotte).

== Abstracting and indexing ==
The journal is abstracted and indexed in:

- Social Sciences Citation Index
- Scopus
- PsycINFO
- ProQuest
- Academic OneFile
- Current Contents/Social & Behavioral Sciences
- Dietrich's Index Philosophicus
- Expanded Academic
- International Bibliography of Book Reviews
- International Bibliography of Periodical Literature

According to the Web of Science Journal Citation Reports, the journal has a 2012 impact factor of 1.730.
