= Instream use =

Instream use refers to water use taking place within a stream channel. Examples are hydroelectric power generation, navigation, fish propagation and use, and recreational activities. Some instream uses, usually associated with fish populations and navigation, require a minimum amount of water to be viable.

The term is often used in discussions concerning water resources allocation and/or water rights.

== See also ==
- Water law
- International trade and water
