= World Water Monitoring Day =

Annual outreach day

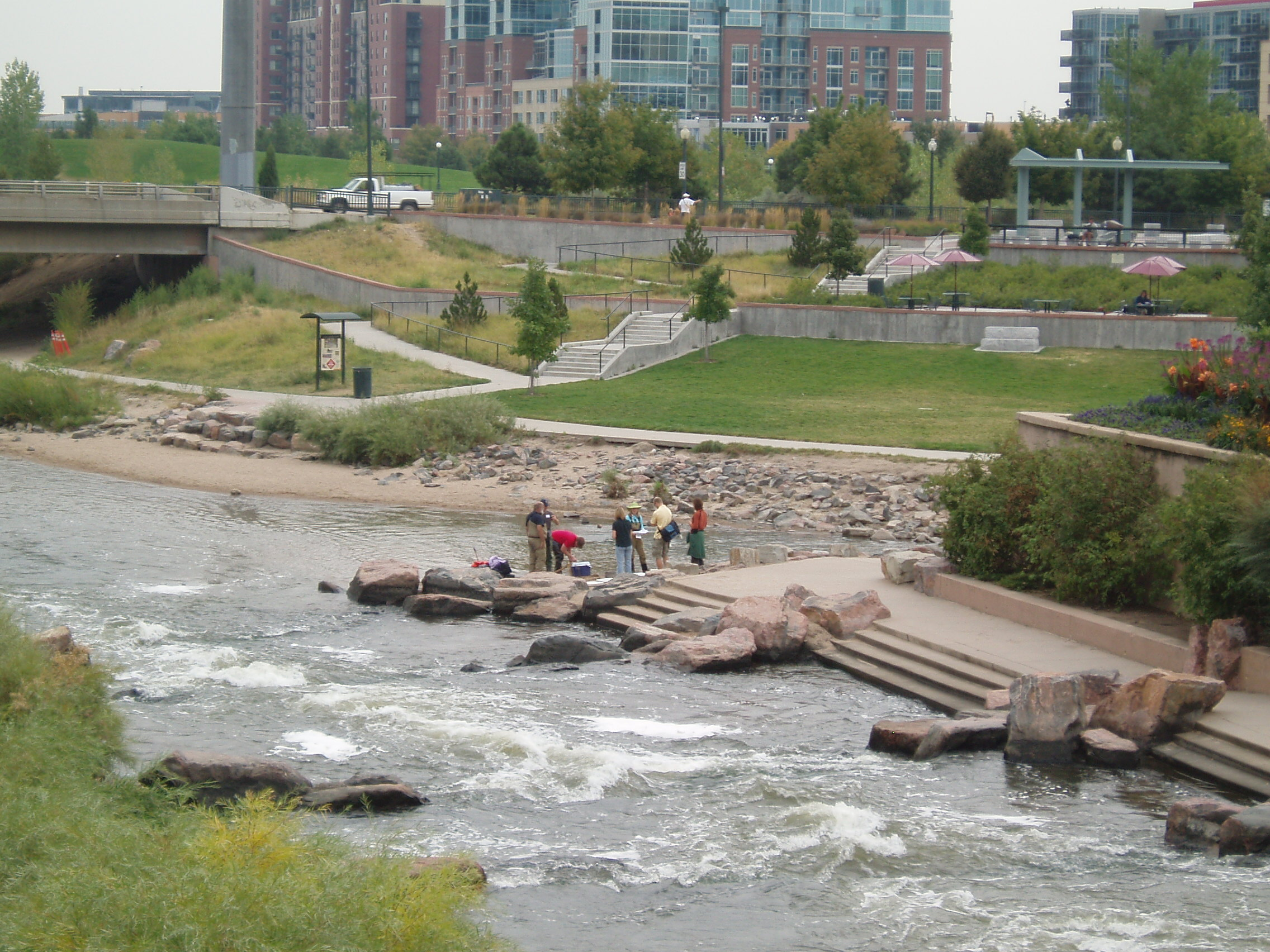
Students in Denver, Colorado conduct monitoring on the South Platte River with Environmental Protection Agency staff on World Water Monitoring Day in 2009.

World Water Monitoring Day was an international day established in 2003 by America's Clean Water Foundation (ACWF) as a global educational outreach program. The program, subsequently named the "World Water Monitoring Challenge" and "EarthEcho Water Challenge," aims to build public awareness and involvement in protecting water resources around the world by empowering citizens to carry out basic monitoring of their local water bodies. Roberta (Robbi) Savage, ACWF's president and CEO created WWMD, and Edward Moyer was the first WWMD Coordinator.

A simple test kit enables everyone, children and adults, to sample local water bodies for a set of water quality parameters including temperature, acidity (pH), clarity (turbidity) and dissolved oxygen (DO). Information on purchasing low-cost test kits is available from the current sponsoring organization, EarthEcho International, and the results of monitoring events are then shared with participating communities around the globe on the sponsor's website.

== History ==
World Water Monitoring Day was originally celebrated annually on September 18. This date was initially chosen to be a month later (October 18) to recognize the anniversary of the US Clean Water Act, which was enacted by Congress in 1972 to restore and protect the country's water resources. In 2007, the date was changed to facilitate participation in parts of the world where temperatures reach freezing conditions at that time.

In 2006, ACWF transferred the coordination of the event to the Water Environment Federation (WEF) and the International Water Association (IWA). The collective goal was to expand participation to one million people in 100 countries by 2012. In January 2015 the management of World Water Monitoring Day was transferred to EarthEcho International.

2008 saw students from Indonesia to Arkansas taking part in water sampling to bring attention to the importance of water quality.

As of 2018, EarthEcho International encourages participants to conduct their monitoring activities as part of the "EarthEcho Water Challenge" during any period between March 22 (World Water Day) and December of each year.

== See also ==
- International trade and water
