= Architecturally significant requirements =

Type of requirement in systems engineering

Architecturally significant requirements are those requirements that have a measurable effect on a computer system’s architecture. This can comprise both software and hardware requirements. They are a subset of requirements that affect a system architecture in measurably identifiable ways.

== Relation to non-functional requirements and quality attributes ==
Architecturally significant requirements were only recently, as of 2016, recognized as an important notion. When discussing architecture, the terms non-functional requirements or quality attributes are often used. However, recent empirical studies show that, for a software system, not all non-functional requirements affect its architecture, and functional requirements can also affect its architecture. This research suggests distinguishing which software requirements are architecturally significant and whether they are functional when discussing software architecture is worth it.

== Characteristics ==
Architecturally significant requirements can be characterized by the following aspects.

=== Descriptive characteristics ===
Architecturally significant requirements are often hard to define and articulate, tend to be expressed vaguely, tend to be initially neglected, tend to be hidden within other requirements, and are subjective, variable, and situational. Other requirements could also demonstrate these descriptive characteristics. However, architecturally significant requirements’ significance made these manifestations unique and challenging.

=== Indicators ===
A requirement with a broad effect targets trade-off points, is strict (constraining, limiting, non-negotiable), assumption-breaking, or difficult to achieve, and is likely to be architecturally significant.

Indicators of architectural significance that have been reported in the literature include:

- The requirement is associated with high business value and/or technical risk.
- The requirement is a concern of a particularly influential stakeholder.
- The requirement has a first-of-a-kind character, e.g. none of the responsibilities of existing components in the architecture address it.
- The requirement has QoS/SLA characteristics that deviate from those already satisfied by the evolving architecture.
- The requirement has caused budget overruns or client dissatisfaction in a previous project with a similar context.

The OpenUP and Peter Eeles discuss additional criteria for architectural significance in several articles and presentations. Seven criteria for architectural significance were addressed at the European Conference on Software Architecture in 2020: business value/risk, stakeholder concern, quality level, external dependencies, cross-cutting, first-of-a-kind, and source of problems on past projects.

=== Heuristics ===
When a requirement specifies a software system’s quality attributes, refers to its core features, imposes constraints on it, or defines the environment in which it will run, it is likely to be architecturally significant.

See discussion of design vs. architecture under software architecture for additional criteria of architectural significance.

== Elicitation ==
Like all non-functional requirements and quality attributes, architecturally significant requirements should be specified SMART. Quality attribute scenarios are one way to achieve the S (specific) and the M (measured) criteria in SMART. The Software Engineering Institute recommends Quality Attribute Workshops for this effort. It has been suggested that architecture analysis and design be kept lightweight and flexible; quality attribute trees for specific application genres and technology domains can support such approaches.

Communicating the elicited architecturally significant requirements and any other architectural artifacts in a comprehensible notation and language for the target audience (particularly business stakeholders) is essential.

== Impact ==
Architecturally significant requirements are used in software design to drive and justify architectural decisions; if not satisfied properly, they contribute to the accumulation of technical debt. For instance, failure to meet security and compliance requirements complicates the system and process assurance audits and increases the risk of audit findings. Exemplary advice on addressing system quality attributes (including architecturally significant requirements) is available in the literature.

== See also ==
- Architectural decision
- Architectural pattern
- Attribute-driven design
- List of system quality attributes
- Non-functional requirement
- Requirements engineering
- Software architecture
- Solution architecture
- Systems architecture
