= Melvin M. Webber =

American urban planning theorist (1920–2006)

- Born: May 6, 1920; Hartford, Connecticut, U.S.
- Died: November 25, 2006 (aged 86); Berkeley, California, U.S.
- Occupations: Urban designer; professor

Academic background
- Education: University of California, Berkeley

Academic work
- Discipline: Urban design
- Institutions: University of California, Berkeley

Melvin M. Webber (May 6, 1920 – November 25, 2006) was an urban designer and theorist associated for most of his career with the University of California at Berkeley but whose work was internationally significant. In 1970, Professor Webber became director of the Institute of Urban and Regional Development (IURD), an author of classic theoretical papers and of major consulting reports, and an active contributor to debates on transportation policy, regional development and planning theory.

His most important work was in the 1960s & 1970s when he pioneered thinking about cities of the future, adapted for the age of telecommunications and mass automotive mobility. These would not be concentric clusters as in the past but urban-associational areas. Webber's 1964 paper Urban Place and the Non-Place Urban Realm set the terms for much of his later work and introduced the idea of 'community without propinquity': cities that were clusters of settlements with the urban realm of its occupants being determined by social links and economic networks in a 'Non-Place Urban Realm'. His 1974 article Permissive Planning developed the idea that urbanists should be enablers not designers or controllers, using an engineering approach to solving urban planning issues. In that paper he criticised urban designers for internalising 'the concepts and methods of design from civil engineering and architecture'.

Webber was also well known for his collaboration with Berkeley colleague, Horst Rittel in their seminal paper in 1973 on wicked problems, ones that defied ready solution by the straightforward application of scientific rationality.

During the 1950s, as Bay Area leaders recognized the need for a regional mass transit system, Webber helped plan the Bay Area Rapid Transit (BART) system. Although his subsequent study documented BART's shortcomings, Webber was concerned about the car-focused implications of his early work. Today his theories are applicable to transport planning using a road hierarchy model in urbanism; one of the more developed examples of his ideas is the mid-1960s design for Milton Keynes (a new city in England), where the Chief Architect Derek Walker described Webber as "the father of the city".

He did his bachelor (1947) and masters (1948) degrees at the University of Texas, Austin before doing a Master of City Planning degree (1952) at Berkeley. In 1956 he returned to Berkeley to teach.

== Publications ==
- Rittel, H.W.J. & M.M. Webber. 1973. "Dilemmas in a General Theory of Planning." Policy Sciences 4(2):155–169
