= Meeting science =

Study of professional meetings

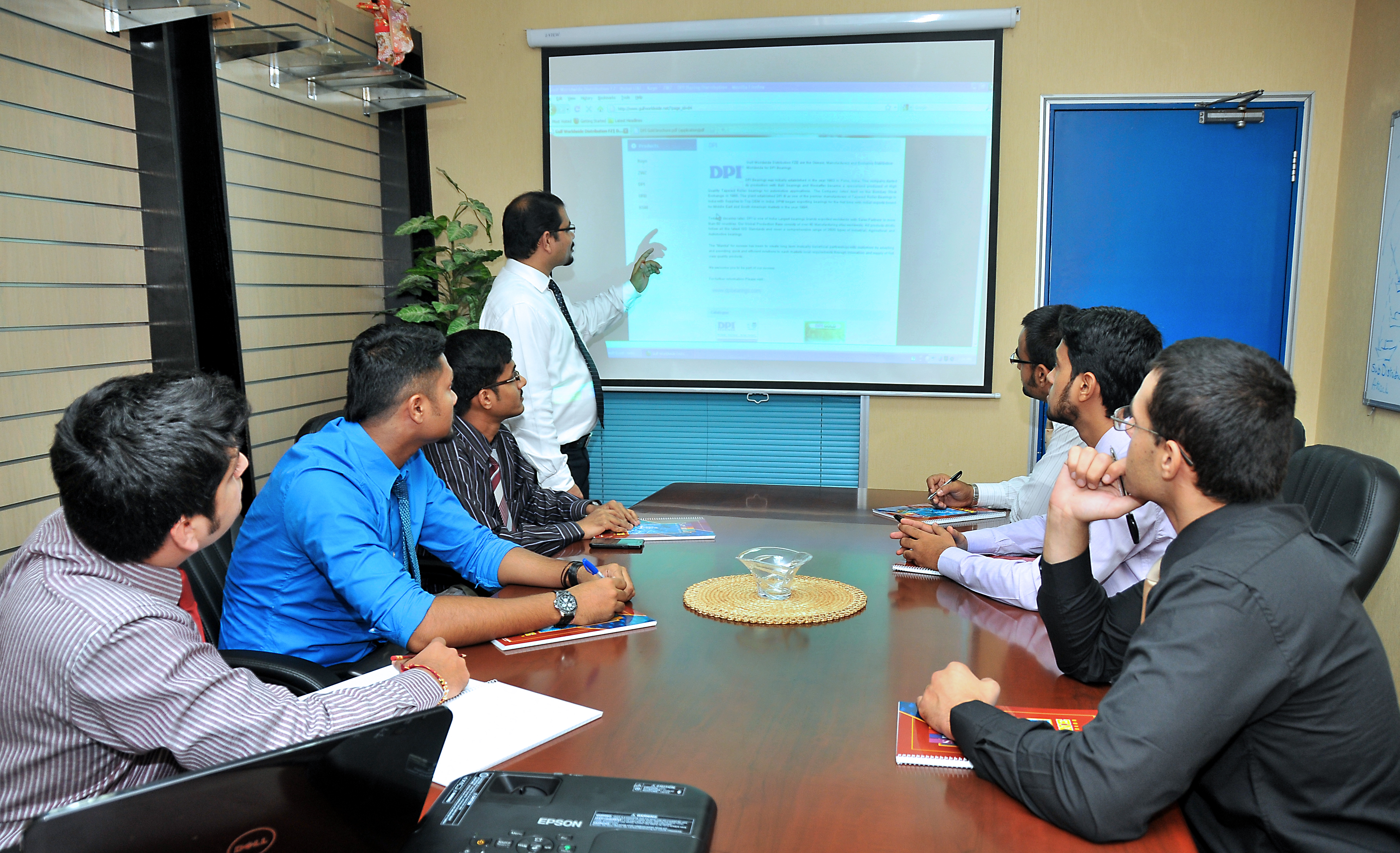
A business meeting

Meeting science is an emerging scientific discipline dedicated to the study, analysis, and optimization of professional meetings. Its primary goal is to enhance the effectiveness, productivity, and satisfaction of meeting participants.

== History ==
Interest in meeting optimisation grew significantly in the early 21st century, especially after the global COVID-19 crisis, which led many organizations to adopt hybrid work policies.

=== Origins ===
With the publication of the Agile Manifesto in 2001, these approaches spread through the implementation of frameworks like Scrum, which includes specific meetings such as sprint planning and retrospectives, and the daily stand-up.

Sociocracy and holacracy, governance models introduced in the 1970s and early 2000s respectively, define specific meeting formats centered on employee participation. Sociocracy rests on four principles: decision-making by consent, organization in circles, double-linking between circles, and election without candidates. Holacracy uses governance meetings and tactical meetings.

Steven Rogelberg and Joseph Allen published The Cambridge handbook of meeting science in 2015, which included work on post-meeting conditions individuals experience. Rogelberg's The surprising science of meetings addresses the impact agenda setting, participant engagement, and decision processes. Allen, a former student of Rogelberg, researches entitativity (a concept developed by Donald T. Campbell in the 1960s) at the University of Utah and has written on remote meetings in hybrid work settings.

The Harvard Business Review and McKinsey have also published articles on meetings.
