= Facilitation (organisational) =

Facilitation in business, organizational development and consensus decision-making refers to the process of designing and running a meeting according to a previously agreed set of requirements.

Facilitation concerns itself with all the tasks needed to reach a productive and impartial meeting outcome that reflects the agreed objectives and deliverables defined upfront by the meeting owner or client.

Facilitation involves leading a meeting on behalf of someone else. This is what distinguishes it from meeting science, which aims to develop the autonomy of meeting initiators and leaders. Nonetheless, facilitation applies many concepts and tools widely used in meeting science such as icebreakers.

== Areas of application ==
Facilitation is "used in a wide range of situations and occupations, including workplaces, leisure and health activities, organizational planning and community development". Facilitation serves the needs of any group who are meeting with a common purpose, whether it be making a decision, solving a problem, or simply exchanging ideas and information. It does not lead the group, nor does it try to distract or to entertain. A slightly different interpretation focuses more specifically on a group that is engaged in experiential learning. In particular this is associated with active learning and concepts of tutelary authority. This is covered in-depth in the research work of John Heron at the University of Surrey and the International Centre for Co-operative Inquiry.

== Competencies ==
The International Association of Facilitators has defined a range of core competencies compiled into a Core Facilitator Competencies framework that includes 6 main competencies and several sub-competencies that underpin a wide range of facilitation dynamics.

== Dynamics ==
Setting ground rules
Often disregarded by those untrained in facilitation, setting ground rules is a key component of the facilitation process especially in meetings convened to discuss difficult problems or for training. These rules are usually reiterated in some form at the outset of a facilitated meeting or workshop to ensure participants understand the various roles being employed and the responsibilities accorded to each. Certain aspects feature highly such as:
- being open to suggestions
- building on what is there, not knocking down ideas
- allowing others space (to speak or express themselves)
- mutual respect
- that the facilitator does not own the topic under discussion and the identity of that owner is clear
- rules of engagement such as time-outs and procedures that will be adopted
- how unresolved issues will be captured and dealt with
- Finally it is key that, during the meeting, it is clear that the owner of the topic is not expected to intervene to impose ideas beyond setting out parameters for consideration or to give insight. The facilitator in this respect owns the process of the meeting.

These are all closely associated with the idea of facilitation as a tool of (workplace) empowerment.

Consulting with the client
A facilitator will work with a client who is someone in an organisation, or diverse group, who is calling them and has invited the facilitator to assist. They will try to understand the purpose and outcome of the meeting by discussing it with the client.
Making arrangements for the meeting
The practical arrangements will be arranged or managed by the facilitator. They will also consider in detail the location and layout of the room. They will research the meeting beforehand to understand why it is being held and that all stakeholders are invited and able to attend.
Setting the agenda
They will understand in detail how each item on the agenda is to be tackled and how long it should take. Using specialist techniques they will allow participants to understand all the issues at stake and all alternative courses of action. The Facilitator designs the process (agenda) based on his or her discussions with the participants and the Facilitator's process expertise.
Understanding group norms
They will not make assumptions about the way people interact and will try to adapt to the ways of different cultures and organisations.
Understanding group dynamics
Whilst tackling the practical aspects of a meeting they remain aware of undercurrents, both verbal and non-verbal, which may indicate problems the group is having. The facilitator may try to assist the group in becoming aware of these.
Consider the need to flexcilitate "Flex-cil-a-tate"
whereby one flexibly facilitates a discussion or a meeting with an end goal and a plan in mind to get there and then adjust the plan based on the responses and direction the group go but still bring them back around to the end goal.

== Facilitator ==
The tasks and responsibilities listed below do not need to be covered by a single facilitator. The role is often shared by multiple people, for instance one person may arrange the logistics before the meeting, another person may keep time and monitor the agenda during the meeting, and a third person may be responsible for recording agreements.

- Prior to a meeting, facilitators:
  - research the meeting
  - find out the purpose and goal (if any) of the meeting
  - establish who needs to attend
  - draw up a draft agenda and design the group processes to attain the necessary results
  - share the agenda with potential attendees, changing it as necessary
  - ensure everyone gets fully briefed for the meeting and that everyone knows the purpose and potential consequences of the meeting
- During the meeting, facilitators:
  - monitor the agenda
  - keep time
  - manage the group process
  - encourage participation from all attendees
  - help participants understand different points of view
  - foster solutions that incorporate diverse points of view
  - manage participant behaviour
  - create a safe environment
  - teach new thinking skills and facilitate structured thinking activities
  - record (with an agreed phraseology) agreements. They may also note unresolved issues for later debate.
- The facilitator may write up and publish the results of the meeting to everyone concerned including those who could not attend.

== Forms of meeting ==
A meeting usually means everyone is together in the same room at the same time and this is the major situation in which facilitation is practiced. With the introduction of modern telecommunications the field has grown to embrace other forms of meetings:

Same time same place
The traditional meeting in a room with all parties present at the same time.
Same time different place
The teleconference with either all parties at separate locations or with some in geographically dispersed sub meetings, all with audio / video connection.
Different time same place
A meeting focussing on a particular physical location where people contribute as they pass by. A wall mounted notice board and/or poster display which allows individuals to add comments as they pass is one example . A survey using un-networked computers in a kiosk would also be a "different time same place" meeting.
Different time different place
Meeting via a web link such as discussion groups, forums, blogs, and usenet. Specialist web-enabled group decision support software exists. Wikipedia discussion pages fall into this category.

Virtual facilitation

With the upheaval of the Digital Revolution the widespread use of Video conference combined with other digital tools for collaboration gave rise to an emergent field of virtual facilitation that occurs in the same time, different place meetings. Online meetings and workshops are great examples of virtual facilitation. In short, the approach brings remote team members together to discuss relevant topics in real-time.

== See also ==
- Decision conferencing
- Dialogue mapping
- Gradients of agreement scale
- Graphic facilitation
