= Gradients of agreement scale =

Scale to express level of agreement

The Gradients of Agreement Scale was developed in 1987 by Sam Kaner, Duane Berger, and the staff of Community At Work.

It enables members of a group to express their support for a proposal in degrees, along a continuum. Using this tool, group members are no longer trapped into expressing support in terms of "yes" and "no."

The book "The Facilitator's Guide to Participatory Decision-Making" has been translated into Spanish, French, Russian, Mandarin, Arabic and Swahili, and it has been used in organizations large and small throughout the world.

== Links ==
- Facilitator's Guide to Participatory Decision-Making
- Team Decision Making: The Gradients of Agreement

== Literature ==
- Facilitator's Guide to Participatory Decision-Making, 3rd Edition. Sam Kaner. ISBN 978-1-118-40495-9, 432 pages, June 2014, Jossey-Bass
