= Michael P. Howlett =

Canadian political scientist

Michael P. Howlett is the Burnaby Mountain Professor and Canada Research Chair (Tier 1) in the Department of Political Science at Simon Fraser University in Burnaby, British Columbia, and was Yong Pung How Chair Professor in the Lee Kuan Yew School of Public Policy at the National University of Singapore. He specializes in comparative policy studies with a focus on resource and environmental policy-making.

He is the current Editor-in-Chief of Policy Sciences, the oldest journal internationally in the field of policy studies. He is also Editor of the Cambridge University Press series on Comparative Public Policy and is the Secretary of Research Committee 30 (Comparative Public Policy) of the International Political Science Association.

Howlett has co-authored a leading text in the field, Studying Public Policy: Policy Cycles and Policy Subsystems, which is now entering its fourth edition and has been translated into 10 languages.
