= Steven Rogelberg =

American industrial and organizational psychologist and professor

- Born: 1967 (age 58–59); New York City, New York, U.S.
- Citizenship: American
- Education: Tufts University (BS); University of Connecticut (PhD)
- Occupations: Psychologist, academic

Steven G. Rogelberg (born 1967) is an American industrial and organizational psychologist. He is a professor at the University of North Carolina at Charlotte, where he founded the Organizational Science program. He is also the co-editor-in-chief of the Journal of Business and Psychology.

== Early life and education ==
Rogelberg was born in New York City and grew up in Los Angeles, California. He earned a Bachelor of Science degree in psychology from Tufts University in 1989. He completed a master's degree in 1991 and a PhD in industrial and organizational psychology at the University of Connecticut in 1994.

== Career and professional activities ==
Rogelberg has served as president of the Society for Industrial and Organizational Psychology (SIOP) and as secretary general of the Alliance for Organizational Psychology.

He also established and directs two outreach initiatives: the Volunteer Program Assessment (VPA) and the Shelter Employee Engagement and Development System (SEEDS). VPA is a program designed to help non-profit organizations evaluate their volunteer programs, while SEEDS is a survey system for animal shelters that gathers employee feedback on workplace issues.

== Books ==
- Rogelberg, S. G. (2019). The surprising science of meetings: How you can lead your team to peak performance. Oxford University Press. ISBN 9780190689216
- Rogelberg, S. G. (2024). Glad we met: The art and science of 1:1 meetings. Oxford University Press. ISBN 9780197641873
- Allen, J. A., Lehmann-Willenbrock, N., & Rogelberg, S. G. (Eds.). (2015). The Cambridge handbook of meeting science. Cambridge University Press. https://doi.org/10.1017/CBO9781107589735
- Rogelberg, S. G. (Ed.). (2006). The encyclopedia of industrial and organizational psychology (Vols. 1–2). Thousand Oaks, CA: Sage Publishing.
- Rogelberg, S. G. (Ed.). (2002/2004). Handbook of research methods in industrial and organizational psychology. London: Blackwell.

== Awards and honours ==
Awards and honours Rogelberg has received include:

- 2026 Governor's Medallion Award for Volunteer Service
- Humboldt Award (2017)
- 2017 Humboldt Research Award Prize
