= International trade and water =

International trade and water is the relationship between international trade and the water being used by humans. The substantial increase in human population during the 20th century combined with rapid increases in overall global economic development has resulted in rising challenges for the future of public water management. The developing world has been particularly impacted by the lack of access to clean water.

Each year, millions of people die due to illnesses, diseases, and lack the capital to create the infrastructure necessary to combat the problem. These conditions have increased the global demand for clean water and in turn, have pressured free market economists to suggest that wealthy market players are the most efficient solution to addressing water issues.

Several nations can benefit from international trade in water. Particularly nations with excess fresh water and abundant capital are looking forward to making healthy profits from either the export of water to other nations, or are interested in the investment returns they will earn from participation in foreign markets.

However, not everyone agrees that market forces are best capable of solving water issues. NGOs, human rights organizations, and various stakeholders oppose viewing water in economic terms. These individuals accuse international trade agreements and international economic institutions including the World Bank and the International Monetary Fund (IMF) of attempting to privatize a resource that they consider a basic human right. The lack of a common understanding of whether or not water should be viewed as a commodity or a basic human right has resulted in heated debates among legal professionals and leading members of academia.

== Water as a commodity ==
Prior to the industrial period, water had been extracted by whichever local community lived around it. As the industrial period progressed however, this view began to be replaced by a more economic oriented approach. Today, most water goes through a complicated industrial process that begins with its extraction and ends in a complicated process involving pipes, dams, and other sorts of unnatural facilities. Even fresh water that is located in rivers and lakes must somehow be extracted. In general these considerations involve the use of land, labor and capital thereby replacing the notion of a common resource into a value based product. Desalination and desalination plants also play a major role.

== International institutions, international trade agreements and water privatization ==
In 2000, out of the 40 IMF loans distributed 12 had requirements of partial or full privatization of water supplies.iv Likewise 50 percent of World Bank loans issued in 2002 to developing countries contained a clause that requested privatization of water services. In addition to international institutions pushing for privatization, trade agreements in the 20th century have also created the legal framework for allowing the sale of water. The GATS, known as the General Agreement on Trade in Services, operates on a list in approach, meaning it allows privatization in areas that the nation has agreed to open to other members. The Doha Development Round of negotiations aims at changing this stature. During these negotiations it was declared that no sector is to be excluded from the negotiations to the new agreement. If water services negotiations succeed then once a member chooses to open their markets to their own private sector, then will have to afford other members the same rights to invest in that sector. Many regional trade agreements do not have a list in approach and are therefore subject to the same conditions mentioned above. For example, in the US-CAFTA agreement only Costa Rica directly specified that water services were to be excluded from foreign investment the other nations made no similar request. Due to the mixed results obtained from privatization of water services and the difficulty of reversing that decision, several actors have strongly opposed the export of bulk fresh water. These actors claim that once such an action is allowed to occur then it will establish a precedent of treating water just like any other export. This in turn will become legally binding and irreversible.

== International trade and water legal disputes and politics ==
Canada is one of the largest owners of fresh water and has for years been engaged in a legal dispute over its possession of the resource. In 1990 an American company named Sunbelt was invited by the government of British Columbia to invest in a water exporting operation. Due to setbacks, the contract never matured and Sunbelt sued the government of British Columbia for failing to meet its obligations. After years of battle the Canadian government declared in 1999 that water in its fresh state as those found in rivers and lakes contains no economic value, and is therefore outside the obligations of its trade agreement. In addition, the government cited article XI of GATT (G). This article allows for the conservation of a natural resource as long as the action taken by the government is done in a non-discriminatory manner. Sunbelt however, disagreed with the applicability of this clause and claimed that Canada’s actions are in direct violation of several international trade agreements. Particularly, Sunbelt addressed Article XI of GATT which forbids a member nation from imposing measures other than taxes, levies and other charges on the export of its good. Likewise, Sunbelt argued that the water located in British Columbia belonged to US companies just as much as it belongs to Canadian companies. This argument is based on Article 11 of NAFTA known as the investment chapter. Once water is extracted from its natural state for whatever reason that same right must be given to foreign investors. Sunbelt argues that Canadian companies had such extractions in the past and therefore opened the door for foreign investors to come in and do likewise.

== Turkey-Israel ==
In 2002, Israel agreed to buy 1.75 billion cubic feet of water from Turkey every year for a period of 20 years. The method of transport involved the use of large plastic bubbles that would bring the water to the storage facility. In regards to the talks, the foreign minister of Turkey declared that this agreement will increase the cooperation between the two countries and also lead to peace and stability in the Middle East. Economically Israel concluded that the cost of importing water would be higher than choosing the desalinization option but chose to import anyway. In addition to hoping to achieve peace the foreign minister also mentioned that the landmark agreement turns water into an internationally accepted commodity, and that Turkey hopes to sell water to other countries. Turkey canceled the deal after the Gaza flotilla raid by IDF commandos on May 31, 2010. During this incident several Turkish nationals were killed by Israeli armed forces.

== UN declaration ==
In July 2010, the UN General Assembly declared that access to clean water and sanitation is a human right. The assembly did not specify whether a public authority or the private sector would be best capable of providing this right.

== See also ==
- Gaza blockade
- Shared vision planning
- Spragg Bag
- Water law
- Water privatization
- Water trading
- World Water Monitoring Day
