= Function analysis diagram =

A function analysis diagram (FAD) is a method used in engineering design to model and visualize the functions and interactions between components of a system or product. It represents the functional relationships through a diagram consisting of blocks, which represent physical components, and labeled relations/arrows between them, which represent useful or harmful functional interactions.

== Overview ==
The FAD method was first proposed in a 1997 patent by the company Invention Machine Corporation as part of their TRIZ-based software tools. It has been further developed through research collaborations between academia and industry.

FAD modeling is considered more intuitive than traditional function analysis methods like function trees and function structures because it incorporates the physical structure of the product. It allows capturing a richer network of functional relationships compared to the linear representations from other methods. The layout of the diagram can also mirror the spatial arrangement of components, conveying additional meaning.

By explicitly mapping out functional interactions between components, FAD diagrams help capture the rationale of why a product is designed the way it is. Modeling harmful or undesired functions provides a starting point for generating design improvements.

== Modeling ==
FAD diagrams consist of labelled blocks representing the physical components, users, or environmental resources related to the product. The relations between blocks are shown as labelled arrows that describe useful or harmful functional interactions. For example, a piston block can have a "compresses air" relation to a cylinder block.

More complex FAD models can be created hierarchically by linking diagrams that focus on different system states or levels of detail. Research has developed techniques for providing overview visualizations of the network of linked FAD diagrams.

While natural language terms are often used for labelling functional interactions in FAD, conventions and shorthands can be defined for recurring relation types to approach a modeling language. Examples include shorthand notation for effort and flow transformations in power systems.

== Intended benefits ==
Intended benefits of FAD modeling include:

- Simple and intuitive notation
- Presence of product structure makes it easy to use
- Captures richer network of functional relationships
- Layout can reflect spatial arrangement of components
- Captures design rationale and reasoning
- Identifies areas for design improvement
- Can represent hierarchical/complex systems

== Applications ==
FAD has been used to model and analyze engineering systems in domains including aerospace, manufacturing, and power systems. It provides an intuitive representation for sharing and discussing functional knowledge of product designs.

Potential applications include:

- Capturing design rationale to reflect on decisions
- Supporting adaptive and variant design tasks
- Enabling reuse of functional knowledge
- Revealing areas for design improvement
- Improving manufacturing quality and reliability

== Tools ==
While FAD diagrams can be created with general drawing and mapping tools, some engineering design software packages provide specific support for building FAD models. These include:

- Decision Rationale editor (DRed)
- TechOptimizer (Invention Machine Corporation)
- DesignVUE (Imperial College London)
