= Horst Rittel =

German design researcher (1930–1990)

Horst Wilhelm Johannes Rittel
- Born: 14 July 1930; Berlin, Germany
- Died: 9 July 1990 (aged 59); Heidelberg, West Germany
- Known for: Wicked Problems, Issue-Based Information Systems, Design Theory
- Title: Professor
- Spouse: Anita

Academic work
- Discipline: Architecture, Planning, Design Theory
- Institutions: Ulm School of Design Germany, University of California at Berkeley Washington University in St. Louis University of Stuttgart

Horst Wilhelm Johannes Rittel (14 July 1930 – 9 July 1990) was a design theorist and university professor. He is best known for popularizing the concept of wicked problem, but his influence on design theory and practice was much wider.

His field of work is the science of design, or, as it also known, the area of design theories and methods (DTM), with the understanding that activities like planning, engineering, and policy making are included as particular forms of design.

In response to the perceived failures of early attempts at systematic design, he introduced the concept of "second generation design methods" and a planning/design method known as issue-based information system (IBIS) for handling wicked problems.

== Early career ==
Rittel was born in Berlin. From 1958 to 1963, he was Professor of Design Methodology at the Ulm School of Design in Germany (Hochschule für Gestaltung—HfG Ulm).

== Later career ==
- 1963 — 1990 Professor of the Science of Design at the University of California, Berkeley, College of Environmental Design, Department of Architecture and Department of City and Regional Planning
- 1967 Visiting Associate Professor for Architecture and Operations Research at Washington University in St. Louis.
- 1973 — 1990 Director and Professor at the University of Stuttgart, Faculty for Architecture and Town Planning.

He died in Heidelberg, aged 59.

== Wicked problems ==
Rittel popularized the term wicked problem in the mid-1960s to describe the ill-defined problems of planning. Rittel and Melvin Webber published the seminal paper on Wicked Problems in the journal Policy Sciences in 1973. Although the subject of Wicked Problems is sometimes considered to have originated in the Social Sciences, as a professor in a department of architecture Rittel was clear that architectural design problems were also wicked problems.

== IBIS ==
IBIS (for issue-based information system) is the instrumental version of the understanding of design as argumentation. It is a method to guide the design process and to reinforce deliberation and argumentation. A number of computer-based versions of IBIS have been and are being developed for various computer systems (personal computers and workstations).

The idea of IBIS was conceived in 1968. It has served as a regular teaching tool, in order to demonstrate the typical difficulties of design and the different ways of dealing with them. IBIS was an idea "waiting for an appropriate technology" in order to become more effective and attractive. The various previous applications have been more or less successful, but have suffered from bureaucratic clumsiness. The recent availability of "hypertext" data-structures and user interfaces—even on small microcomputers and moderately priced workstations—has allowed the design of IBISes which are much more "user-friendly" than their predecessors. Today, there are a number of IBIS programs, developed and implemented on a variety of machines.

Some crucial old weaknesses of IBIS remain the same: the danger of getting lost in the web of cross-references, the lack of a "synoptic" overview of the state of resolution, and the "logic of the next question", i.e. the problem of prestructuring the possibilities for guiding the designers' deliberations into plausible directions.

== See also ==
- Design rationale
