= Policy Sciences =

- Discipline: Public policy
- Language: English
- Edited by: Michael P. Howlett

Publication details
- History: 1970–present
- Publisher: Springer Science+Business Media on behalf of the Society of Policy Scientists
- Frequency: Quarterly
- Impact factor: 3.023 (2017)

Standard abbreviations
- ISO 4: Policy Sci.

Indexing
- ISSN: 0032-2687 (print); 1573-0891 (web)
- LCCN: 79023541
- JSTOR: 00322687
- OCLC no.: 905451440

Links
- Journal homepage; Online archive

Policy Sciences is a quarterly peer-reviewed academic journal covering issues and practices in the policy studies. It was established in 1970 and is published by Springer Science+Business Media on behalf of the Society of Policy Scientists. The editor-in-chief is Michael P. Howlett (Simon Fraser University).

== Abstracting and indexing ==
The journal is abstracted and indexed in:

- Current Contents/Social & Behavioral Sciences
- EBSCO databases
- EconLit
- GEOBASE
- International Bibliography of Periodical Literature
- International Bibliography of the Social Sciences
- International Political Science Abstracts
- ProQuest databases
- Research Papers in Economics
- Scopus
- Social Sciences Citation Index

According to the Journal Citation Reports, the journal has a 2017 impact factor of 3.023, ranking it ninth out of 57 journals in the category "Planning and Development", seventh out of 47 journals in the category "Public Administration", and fifth out of 98 journals in the category "Social Sciences, Interdisciplinary".

== Editors-in-chief ==
The following persons are or have been editor-in-chief of the journal:

- 1970-1973 E.S. Quade (RAND Corporation)
- 1974-1977 Garry Brewer (RAND Corporation/University of South Carolina/Yale University)
- 1978-1980 Thomas J. Anton (University of Michigan)
- 1981-1983 Peter de Leon (Columbia University)
- 1984-1986 Ronald Brunner (University of Colorado Boulder)
- 1987-1990 William Ascher (Duke University)
- 1991-1992 Garry Brewer (Yale University)
- 1992-1995 Douglas Torgerson (Trent University)
- 1996-1998 Patrick Larkey (Carnegie Mellon University)
- 1999-2001 John D. Montgomery (Harvard University)
- 2002-2004 Steven Brown (Kent State University)
- 2005-2008 Matthew Auer (Indiana University)
- 2009-2014 Toddi Steelman (North Carolina State University/University of Saskatchewan)
- 2015-present Michael Howlett (Simon Fraser University/National University of Singapore)

== Harold Lasswell Prize ==
Since 1984, the association has awarded the Harold Lasswell Memorial Prize for the best article published in the current volume of the journal. The prize selection committee usually is drawn from the editorial board and Springer Science+Business Media underwrites all expenses related to the prize.

== See also ==
- List of political science journals
- List of public administration journals
