= Wicked problem =

Problem that is difficult or impossible to solve

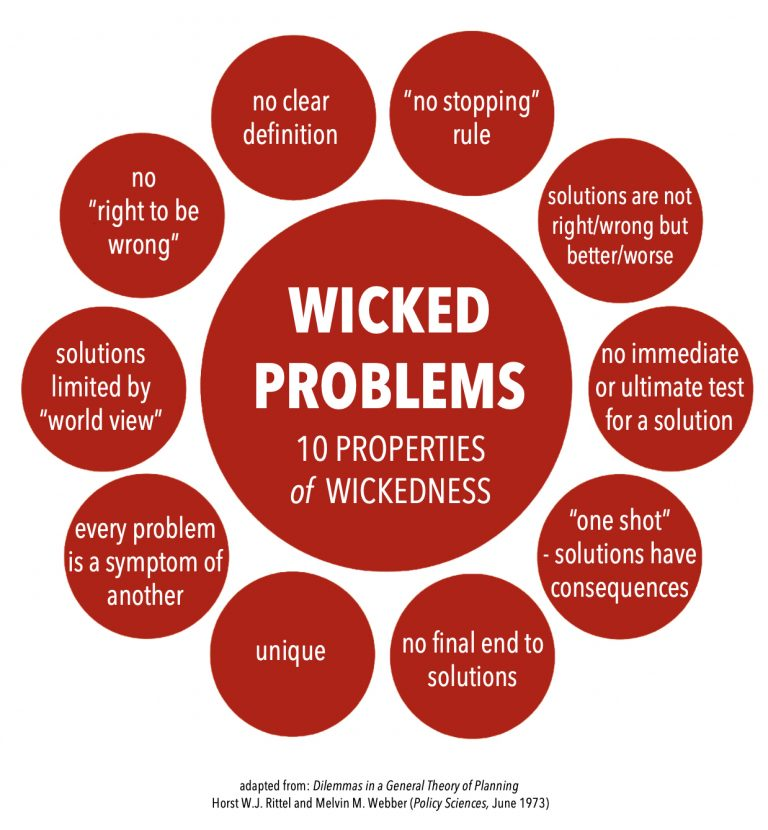
The diagram of Rittel and Webber that defines the properties of the Wicked problems

In planning and policy, a wicked problem is a problem that is difficult or impossible to solve because of incomplete, contradictory, and changing requirements that are often difficult to recognize. It refers to an idea or problem that cannot be fixed, where there is no single solution to the problem; "wicked" does not indicate evil, but rather resistance to resolution. Another definition is "a problem whose social complexity means that it has no determinable stopping point". Because of complex interdependencies, the effort to solve one aspect of a wicked problem may reveal or create other problems. Due to their complexity, wicked problems are often characterized by organized irresponsibility.

The phrase was originally used in social planning. Its modern sense was introduced in 1967 by C. West Churchman in a guest editorial he wrote in the journal Management Science. He explains that "The adjective 'wicked' is supposed to describe the mischievous and even evil quality of these problems, where proposed 'solutions' often turn out to be worse than the symptoms". In the editorial, he credits Horst Rittel with first describing wicked problems, though it may have been Churchman who coined the term. Churchman discussed the moral responsibility of operations research "to inform the manager in what respect our 'solutions' have failed to tame his wicked problems." Rittel and Melvin M. Webber formally described the concept of wicked problems in a 1973 treatise, contrasting "wicked" problems with relatively "tame", solvable problems in mathematics, chess, or puzzle solving.

== Characteristics ==
Rittel and Webber's 1973 formulation of wicked problems in social policy planning specified ten characteristics:

1. There is no definitive formulation of a wicked problem.
2. Wicked problems have no stopping rule.
3. Solutions to wicked problems are not true-or-false, but better or worse.
4. There is no immediate and no ultimate test of a solution to a wicked problem.
5. Every solution to a wicked problem is a "one-shot operation"; because there is no opportunity to learn by trial and error, every attempt counts significantly.
6. Wicked problems do not have an enumerable (or an exhaustively describable) set of potential solutions, nor is there a well-described set of permissible operations that may be incorporated into the plan.
7. Every wicked problem is essentially unique.
8. Every wicked problem can be considered to be a symptom of another problem.
9. The existence of a discrepancy representing a wicked problem can be explained in numerous ways. The choice of explanation determines the nature of the problem's resolution.
10. The social planner has no right to be wrong (i.e., planners are liable for the consequences of the actions they generate).

Conklin later generalized the concept of problem wickedness to areas other than planning and policy; Conklin's defining characteristics are:

1. The problem is not understood until after the formulation of a solution.
2. Wicked problems have no stopping rule.
3. Solutions to wicked problems are not right or wrong.
4. Every wicked problem is essentially novel and unique.
5. Every solution to a wicked problem is a "one shot operation".
6. Wicked problems have no given alternative solutions.

== Examples ==
Classic examples of wicked problems include social, legal, economic, environmental, and political issues. A problem whose solution requires a great number of people to change their mindsets and behavior is likely to be a wicked problem. Therefore, many standard examples of wicked problems come from the areas of public planning and policy. These include global climate change, natural hazards, healthcare, the AIDS epidemic, pandemic influenza, international drug trafficking, nuclear weapons, homelessness, and social injustice.

In recent years, problems in many areas have been identified as exhibiting elements of wickedness; examples range from aspects of design decision making and knowledge management to business strategy to space debris.

== Background ==
Rittel and Webber coined the term in the context of problems of social policy, an arena in which a purely scientific-engineering approach cannot be applied because of the lack of a clear problem definition and differing perspectives of stakeholders. In their words,

The search for scientific bases for confronting problems of social policy is bound to fail because of the nature of these problems... Policy problems cannot be definitively described. Moreover, in a pluralistic society there is nothing like the indisputable public good; there is no objective definition of equity; policies that respond to social problems cannot be meaningfully correct or false; and it makes no sense to talk about "optimal solutions" to these problems... Even worse, there are no solutions in the sense of definitive answers.

Thus wicked problems are also characterised by the following:

1. The solution depends on how the problem is framed and vice versa (i.e., the problem definition depends on the solution)
2. Stakeholders have radically different world views and different frames for understanding the problem.
3. The constraints that the problem is subject to and the resources needed to solve it change over time.
4. The problem is never solved definitively.

Although Rittel and Webber framed the concept in terms of social policy and planning, wicked problems occur in any domain involving stakeholders with differing perspectives. Recognising this, Rittel and Kunz developed a technique called Issue-Based Information System (IBIS), which facilitates documentation of the rationale behind a group decision in an objective manner.

A recurring theme in research and industry literature is the connection between wicked problems and design. Design problems are typically wicked because they are often ill-defined (no prescribed way forward), involve stakeholders with different perspectives, and have no "right" or "optimal" solution. Thus wicked problems cannot be solved by the application of standard (or known) methods; they demand creative, sometimes entrepreneurial solutions.

== Strategies to tackle wicked problems ==
Wicked problems cannot be tackled by the traditional approach in which problems are defined, analysed and solved in sequential steps. The main reason for this is that there is no clear problem definition of wicked problems. Ultimately, the solution to 'Wicked' problems requires additional research to understand the gaps in information pertaining these issues. Governments must invest in more evidence-informed science to address the full scope of these problems. Broader thinking into the appropriate options will allow for more innovation within this process.

In a paper published in 2000, Nancy Roberts identified the following strategies to cope with wicked problems:

Authoritative
These strategies seek to tame wicked problems by vesting the responsibility for solving the problems in the hands of a few people. The reduction in the number of stakeholders reduces problem complexity, as many competing points of view are eliminated at the start. The disadvantage is that authorities and experts charged with solving the problem may not have an appreciation of all the perspectives needed to tackle the problem.
Competitive
These strategies attempt to solve wicked problems by pitting opposing points of view against each other, requiring parties that hold these views to come up with their preferred solutions. The advantage of this approach is that different solutions can be weighed up against each other and the best one chosen. The disadvantage is that this adversarial approach creates a confrontational environment in which knowledge sharing is discouraged. Consequently, the parties involved may not have an incentive to come up with their best possible solution.
Collaborative
These strategies aim to engage all stakeholders in order to find the best possible solution for all stakeholders. Typically these approaches involve meetings in which issues and ideas are discussed and a common, agreed approach is formulated. A significant advantage of this approach is the creation of a strong information sharing environment. The main problem is the risk that certain ideas, while integral to finding a possible solution, may be too controversial to accept by other involved parties. By enhancing the collaborative processes between researchers, this allows for wider coordination of roles within this research. With the inclusion of diverse perspectives into this process, it enhances the potential options and figures considered. The commitment to collaboration in addressing a Wicked problem will likely result in further understanding of the underlying factors and could enhance the means of addressing it.

In his 1972 paper, Rittel hints at a collaborative approach; one which attempts "to make those people who are being affected into participants of the planning process. They are not merely asked but actively involved in the planning process." A disadvantage of this approach is that achieving a shared understanding and commitment to solving a wicked problem is a time-consuming process. Another difficulty is that, in some matters, at least one group of people may hold an absolute belief that necessarily contradicts other absolute beliefs held by other groups. Collaboration then becomes impossible until one set of beliefs is relativized or abandoned entirely.

Research over the last two decades has shown the value of computer-assisted argumentation techniques in improving the effectiveness of cross-stakeholder communication. The technique of dialogue mapping has been used in tackling wicked problems in organizations using a collaborative approach. More recently, in a four-year study of interorganizational collaboration across public, private, and voluntary sectors, steering by government was found to perversely undermine a successful collaboration, producing an organizational crisis which led to the collapse of a national initiative.

In "Wholesome Design for Wicked Problems", Robert Knapp stated that there are ways forward in dealing with wicked problems:

The first is to shift the goal of action on significant problems from "solution" to "intervention." Instead of seeking the answer that totally eliminates a problem, one should recognize that actions occur in an ongoing process, and further actions will always be needed.

Examining networks designed to tackle wicked problems in health care, such as caring for older people or reducing sexually transmitted infections, Ferlie and colleagues suggest that managed networks may be the "least bad" way of "making wicked problems governable".

== Communication of wicked problems ==
=== Problem structuring methods ===
A range of approaches called problem structuring methods (PSMs) have been developed in operations research since the 1970s to address problems involving complexity, uncertainty and conflict. PSMs are usually used by a group of people in collaboration (rather than by a solitary individual) to create a consensus about, or at least to facilitate negotiations about, what needs to change. Some widely adopted PSMs include soft systems methodology, the strategic choice approach, and strategic options development and analysis (SODA).

== Related concepts ==
=== Messes and social messes ===
Russell L. Ackoff wrote about complex problems as messes: "Every problem interacts with other problems and is therefore part of a set of interrelated problems, a system of problems.... I choose to call such a system a mess."

Extending Ackoff, Robert Horn says that "a Social Mess is a set of interrelated problems and other messes. Complexity—systems of systems—is among the factors that makes Social Messes so resistant to analysis and, more importantly, to resolution."

According to Horn, the defining characteristics of a social mess are:

1. No unique "correct" view of the problem;
2. Different views of the problem and contradictory solutions;
3. Most problems are connected to other problems;
4. Data are often uncertain or missing;
5. Multiple value conflicts;
6. Ideological and cultural constraints;
7. Political constraints;
8. Economic constraints;
9. Often a-logical or illogical or multi-valued thinking;
10. Numerous possible intervention points;
11. Consequences difficult to imagine;
12. Considerable uncertainty, ambiguity;
13. Great resistance to change; and,
14. Problem solver(s) out of contact with the problems and potential solutions.

=== Divergent and convergent problems ===
E. F. Schumacher distinguishes between divergent and convergent problems in his book A Guide for the Perplexed. Convergent problems are those for which attempted solutions gradually converge on one solution or answer. Divergent problems are those for which different answers appear to increasingly contradict each other all the more they are elaborated, requiring a different approach involving faculties of a higher order like love and empathy.

=== Wicked problems in software development ===
In 1990, DeGrace and Stahl introduced the concept of wicked problems to software development. In the last decade, other computer scientists have pointed out that software development shares many properties with other design practices (particularly that people-, process-, and technology-problems have to be considered equally), and have incorporated Rittel's concepts into their software design methodologies. The design and integration of complex software-defined services that use the Web (web services) can be construed as an evolution from previous models of software design, and therefore becomes a wicked problem also.

=== Super wicked problems ===
Kelly Levin, Benjamin Cashore, Graeme Auld and Steven Bernstein introduced the distinction between "wicked problems" and "super wicked problems" in a 2007 conference paper, which was followed by a 2012 journal article in Policy Sciences. In their discussion of global climate change, they define super wicked problems as having the following additional characteristics:

1. There is a significant time deadline on finding the solution
2. There is no central authority dedicated to finding a solution
3. Those seeking to solve the problem are also causing it
4. Certain policies irrationally impede future progress

While the items that define a wicked problem relate to the problem itself, the items that define a super wicked problem relate to the agent trying to solve it. Global warming is a super wicked problem, and the need to intervene to tend to our longer term interests has also been taken up by others, including Richard Lazarus.

== See also ==
- Catch-22
- Category:Problem structuring methods
- Collaborative information seeking
- Collective action problem
- Competing harms
- Complex question
- Drama theory
- Encyclopedia of World Problems and Human Potential
- Hard problem of consciousness
- Hyperobject
- Ludic fallacy
- Morphological analysis
- Nonlinear system
- Polycrisis
- Post-normal science
- Problem solving
- Small Is Beautiful
- Social issue
- Societal collapse
- Soft systems methodology
- Structured systems analysis and design method
- Systems theory
