= Business =

Organization engaged in commerce or industry

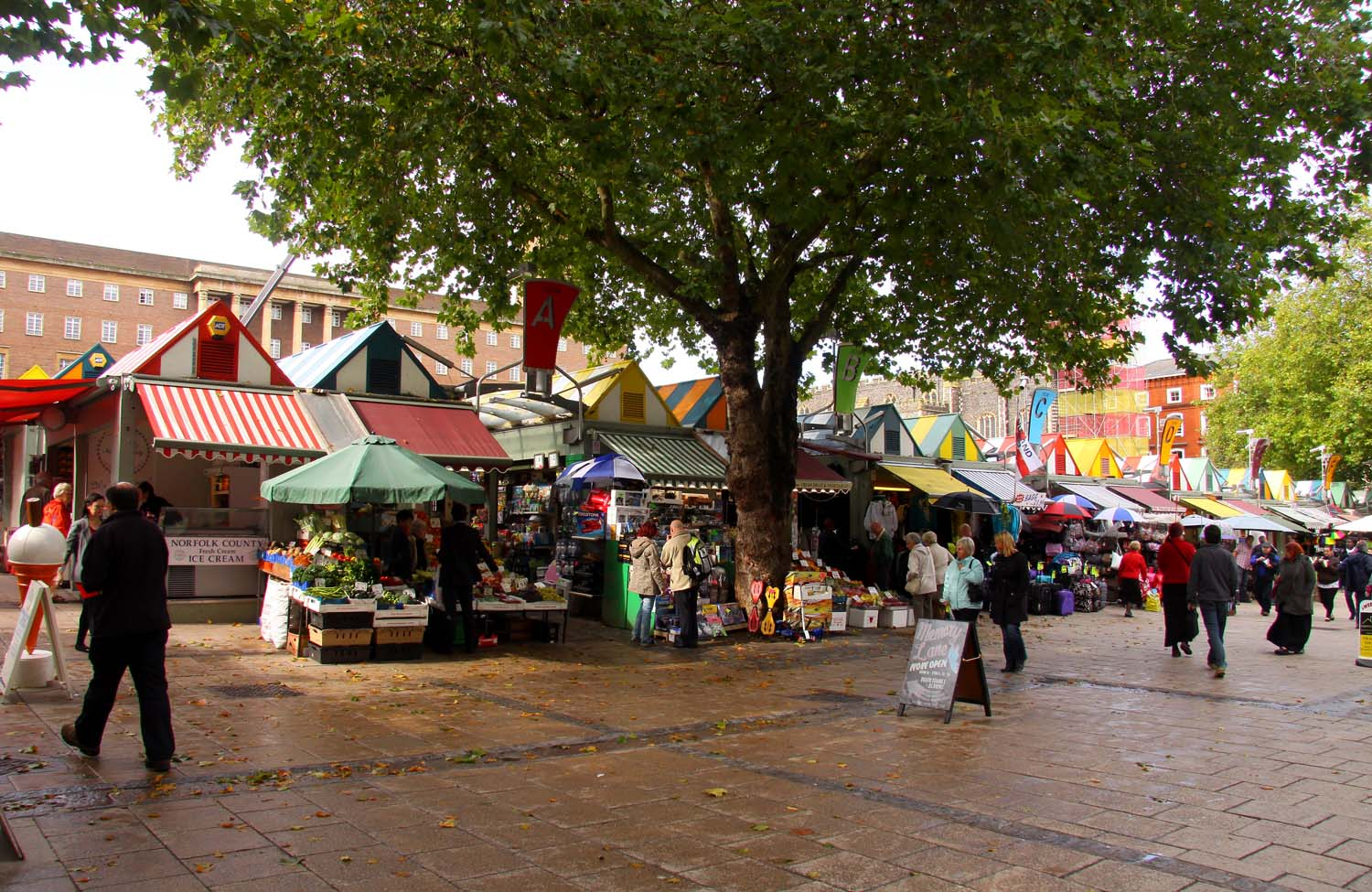
Small business vendors at a public market in Norwich, Norfolk, U.K., 2010

Business is the practice of making one's living or making money by producing or buying and selling products (such as goods and services). It is also "any activity or enterprise entered into for profit".

A business entity is not necessarily separate from the owner and the creditors can hold the owner liable for debts the business has acquired except for limited liability company. The taxation system for businesses is different from that of the corporates. A business structure does not allow for corporate tax rates. The proprietor is personally taxed on all income from the business.

A distinction is made in law and public offices between the term business and a company (such as a corporation or cooperative). Colloquially, the terms are used interchangeably.

Corporations are distinct from sole proprietors and partnerships. Corporations are separate and unique legal entities from their shareholders; as such they provide limited liability for their owners and members. Corporations are subject to corporate tax rates. Corporations are also more complicated, expensive to set up, along with the mandatory reporting of quarterly or annual financial information to the national (or state) securities commissions or company registers, but offer more protection and benefits for the owners and shareholders.

Individuals who are not working for a government agency (public sector) or for a mission-driven charity (nonprofit sector), are almost always working in the private sector, meaning they are employed by a business (formal or informal), whose primary goal is to generate profit, through the creation and capture of economic value above cost. In almost all countries, most individuals are employed by businesses (based on the minority percentage of public sector employees, relative to the total workforce).

== Forms ==
Forms of business ownership vary by jurisdiction, but several common entities exist:

- A sole proprietorship, also known as a sole trader, is owned by one person and operates for their benefit. The owner operates the business alone and may hire employees. A sole proprietor has unlimited liability for all obligations incurred by the business, whether from operating costs or judgments against the business. All assets of the business belong to a sole proprietor, including, for example, a computer infrastructure, any inventory, manufacturing equipment, or retail fixtures, as well as any real property owned by the sole proprietor.
- A partnership is a business owned by two or more people. In most forms of partnerships, each partner has unlimited liability for the debts incurred by the business. The three most prevalent types of for-profit partnerships are general partnerships, limited partnerships, and limited liability partnerships.
- Corporations' owners have limited liability, and the business has a legal personality separate from its owners. Corporations can be either government-owned or privately owned, and they can organize either for profit or as nonprofit organizations. A privately owned, for-profit corporation is owned by its shareholders, who elect a board of directors to direct the corporation and hire its managerial staff. A privately owned, for-profit corporation can be either privately held by a small group of individuals, or publicly held, with publicly traded shares listed on a stock exchange.
- A cooperative or co-op is a limited-liability business that can organize as for-profit or not-for-profit. A cooperative differs from a corporation in that it has members, not shareholders, and they share decision-making authority. Cooperatives are typically classified as either consumer cooperatives or worker cooperatives. Cooperatives are fundamental to the ideology of economic democracy.
- Limited liability companies (LLC) and other specific types of business organization protect their owners or shareholders from business failure by doing business under a separate legal entity with certain legal protections. In contrast, a general partnership or persons working on their own are usually not as protected.
- A franchise is a system in which entrepreneurs purchase the rights to open and run a business from a larger corporation. Franchising in the United States is widespread and is a major economic powerhouse. One out of twelve retail businesses in the United States are franchised and 8 million people are employed in a franchised business.
- Company limited by guarantee is commonly used where companies are formed for non-commercial purposes, such as clubs or charities. The members guarantee the payment of certain (usually nominal) amounts if the company goes into insolvent liquidation, but otherwise, they have no economic rights in relation to the company. This type of company is common in England. A company limited by guarantee may be with or without having share capital.
- A company limited by shares is the most common form of the company used for business ventures. Specifically, a limited company is a "company in which the liability of each shareholder is limited to the amount individually invested" with corporations being "the most common example of a limited company". This type of company is common in England and many English-speaking countries. A company limited by shares may be a
  - publicly traded company or a
  - privately held company.
- A company limited by guarantee with a share capital is a hybrid entity, usually used where the company is formed for non-commercial purposes, but the activities of the company are partly funded by investors who expect a return. This type of company may no longer be formed in the UK, although provisions still exist in law for them to exist.
- An unlimited company with or without a share capital is a hybrid entity, a company where the liability of members or shareholders for the debts (if any) of the company are not limited. In this case, the doctrine of a veil of incorporation does not apply.

Less common types of companies are:

- Most corporations by letters patent are corporations sole and not companies as the term is commonly understood today.
- Charter corporations were the only types of companies before the passing of modern companies legislation. Now they are relatively rare, except for very old companies that still survive (of which there are still many, particularly many British banks), or modern societies that fulfill a quasi-regulatory function (for example, the Bank of England is a corporation formed by a modern charter).
- Statutory companies are certain companies that have been formed by a private statute passed in the relevant jurisdiction, and are relatively rare today.

"Ltd after the company's name signifies limited company, and PLC (public limited company) indicates that its shares are widely held."

In legal parlance, the owners of a company are usually referred to as the "members". In a company limited or unlimited by shares (formed or incorporated with a share capital), this will be the shareholders. In a company limited by guarantee, this will be the guarantors. Some offshore jurisdictions have created special forms of offshore company in a bid to attract business for their jurisdictions. Examples include "segregated portfolio companies" and restricted purpose companies.

There are, however, many, many sub-categories of types of company that can be formed in various jurisdictions in the world.

Companies are also sometimes distinguished into public companies and private companies for legal and regulatory purposes. Public companies are companies whose shares can be publicly traded, often (although not always) on a stock exchange which imposes listing requirements/Listing Rules as to the issued shares, the trading of shares and a future issue of shares to help bolster the reputation of the exchange or particular market of exchange. Private companies do not have publicly traded shares, and often contain restrictions on transfers of shares. In some jurisdictions, private companies have maximum numbers of shareholders.

A parent company is a company that owns enough voting stock in another firm to control management and operations by influencing or electing its board of directors; the second company being deemed as a subsidiary of the parent company. The subsidiary company can be allowed to maintain its own board of directors. The definition of a parent company differs by jurisdiction, with the definition normally being defined by way of laws dealing with companies in that jurisdiction.

== Classifications ==
- Agriculture, such as the domestication of fish, animals, and livestock, as well as lumber, oil, vegetables, fruits, etc.
- Mining businesses that extract natural resources and raw materials, such as wood, petroleum, natural gas, ores, metals or minerals.
- Service businesses offer intangible goods or services and typically charge for labor or other services provided to government, to consumers, or to other businesses. Interior decorators, beauticians, hair stylists, make-up artists, tanning salons, laundromats, dry cleaners, and pest controllers are service businesses.
  - Financial services businesses include banks, brokerage firms, credit unions, credit cards, insurance companies, asset and investment companies such as private-equity firms, private-equity funds, real estate investment trusts, sovereign wealth funds, pension funds, mutual funds, index funds, hedge funds, stock exchanges, and other companies that generate profits through investment and management of capital.
  - Transportation businesses such as railways, airlines, and shipping companies deliver goods and individuals to their destinations for a fee.
  - Utilities produce public services such as water, electricity, waste management or sewage treatment. These industries are usually operated under the charge of a public government.
- Entertainment companies and mass media agencies generate profits primarily from the sale of intellectual property. They include film studios and production houses, mass media companies such as cable television networks, online digital media agencies, talent agencies, mobile media outlets, newspapers, book and magazine publishing houses.
  - Sports organizations are involved in producing, facilitating, promoting, or organizing any activity, experience, or business enterprise focused on sports. They make their profits by selling goods and services that are sports related.
- Industrial manufacturers produce products, either from raw materials or from component parts, then export the finished products at a profit. They include tangible goods such as cars, buses, medical devices, glass, or aircraft.
- Real estate businesses sell, invest, construct and develop properties, including land, residential homes, and other buildings.
- Retailers, wholesalers, and distributors act as middlemen and get goods produced by manufacturers to the intended consumers; they make their profits by marking up their prices. Most stores and catalog companies are distributors or retailers.

== Activities ==
=== Accounting ===
Accounting is the measurement, processing, and communication of financial information about economic entities such as businesses and corporations. The modern field was established by the Italian mathematician Luca Pacioli in 1494. Accounting, which has been called the "language of business", measures the results of an organization's economic activities and conveys this information to a variety of users, including investors, creditors, management, and regulators. Practitioners of accounting are known as accountants. The terms "accounting" and "financial reporting" are often used as synonyms.

=== Commerce ===
Commerce is the process of exchanging goods and services. It is not just a single activity, but a set of activities that includes trade (buying and selling goods and services) and auxiliary services or aids to trade, that includes communication and marketing, logistics, finance, banking, insurance, and legal services related to trade. Business is also defined as engaging in commerce, as these are done in all businesses.

=== Finance ===
Finance is a field that deals with the study of money and investments. It includes the dynamics of assets and liabilities over time under conditions of different degrees of uncertainty and risk. In the context of business and management, finance deals with the problems of ensuring that the firm can safely and profitably carry out its operational and financial objectives; i.e. that it: (1) has sufficient cash flow for ongoing and upcoming operational expenses, and (2) can service both maturing short-term debt repayments, and scheduled long-term debt payments. Finance also deals with the long term objective of maximizing the value of the business, while also balancing risk and profitability; this includes the interrelated questions of (1) capital investment, which businesses and projects to invest in; (2) capital structure, deciding on the mix of funding to be used; and (3) dividend policy, what to do with "excess" capital.

=== Human resources ===
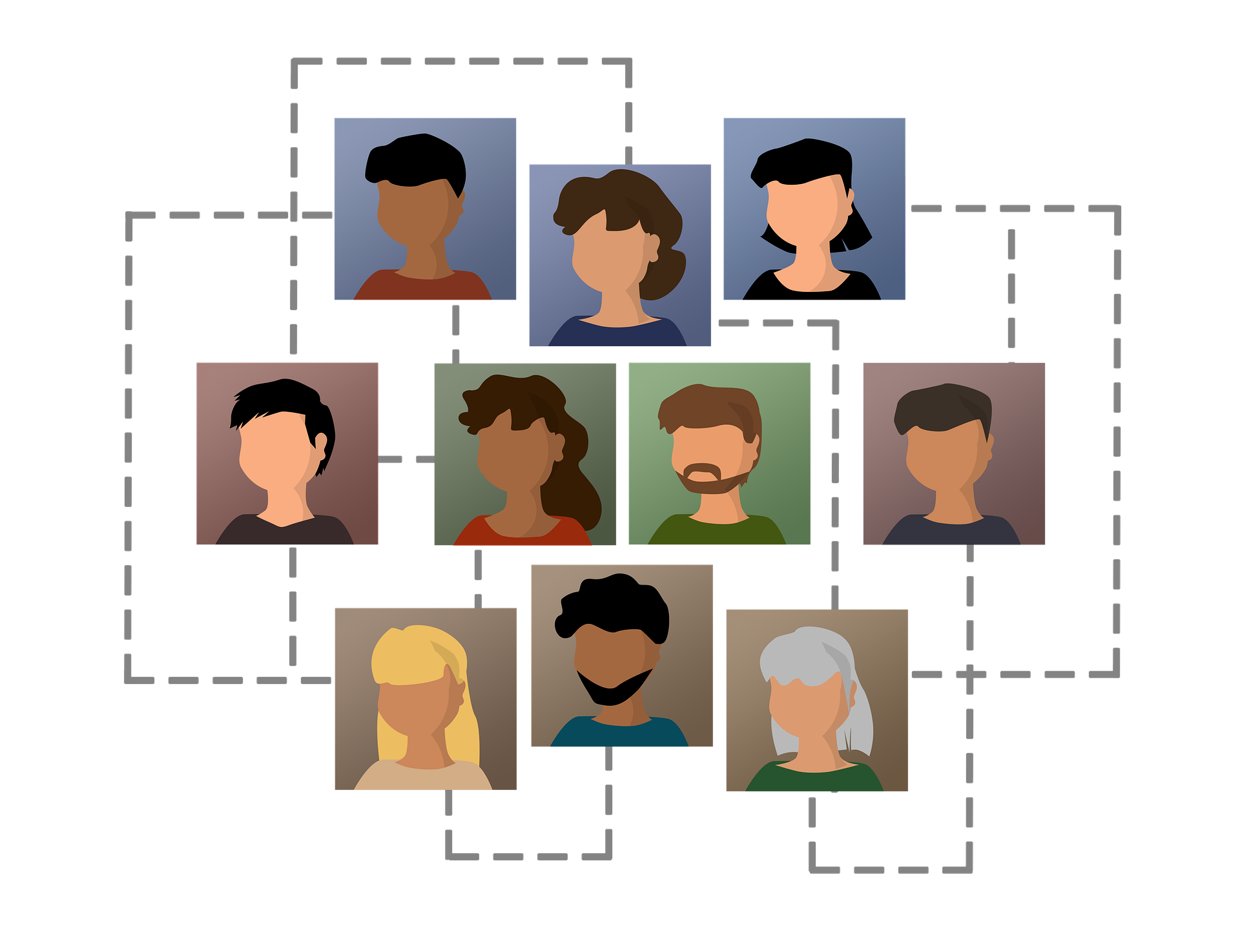

Human resources can be defined as division of business that involves finding, screening, recruiting, and training job applicants. Human resources, or HR, is crucial for all businesses to succeed as it helps companies adjust to a fast-moving business environment and the increasing demand for jobs.

The term "human resource" was coined by John R. Commons in his novel The Distribution of Wealth. HR departments are relatively new as they began developing in the late 20th century. HR departments' main goal is to maximize employee productivity and protecting the company from any issues that may arise in the future. Some of the most common activities conducted by those working in HR include increasing innovation and creativity within a company, applying new approaches to work projects, and efficient training and communication with employees.

Two of the most popular subdivisions of HR are Human Resource Management, HRM, and Human Resource Information Systems, or HRIS. The HRM route is for those who prefer an administrative role as it involves oversight of the entirety of the company. HRIS involves the storage and organization of employee data including full names, addresses, means of contact, and anything else required by that certain company.

Some careers of those involved in the Human Resource field include enrollment specialists, HR analyst, recruiter, employment relations manager, etc.

=== Information technology ===
Many businesses have an Information technology (IT) department, which supports the use of information technology and computer systems in support of enterprise goals. The role of a chief information officer is to lead this department. For example, Ford Motor Company in the United States employs "more than 3,000 team members with advanced computing, analytical and technical skills".

=== Manufacturing ===
Manufacturing is the production of merchandise for use or sale using labour and machines, tools, chemical and biological processing, or formulation. The term may refer to a range of human activity, from handicraft to high tech, but is most commonly applied to industrial production, in which raw materials are transformed into finished goods on a large scale.

=== Marketing ===
Marketing is defined by the American Marketing Association as "the activity, set of institutions, and processes for creating, communicating, delivering, and exchanging offerings that have value for customers, clients, partners, and society at large". The term developed from the original meaning which referred literally to going to a market to buy or sell goods or services. Marketing tactics include advertising as well as determining product pricing.

With the rise in technology, marketing is further divided into a class called digital marketing. It is marketing products and services using digital technologies.

=== Research and development ===
Research and development refer to activities in connection with corporate or government innovation. Research and development constitute the first stage of development of a potential new service or product. Research and development are very difficult to manage since the defining feature of the research is that the researchers do not know in advance exactly how to accomplish the desired result.

=== Safety ===
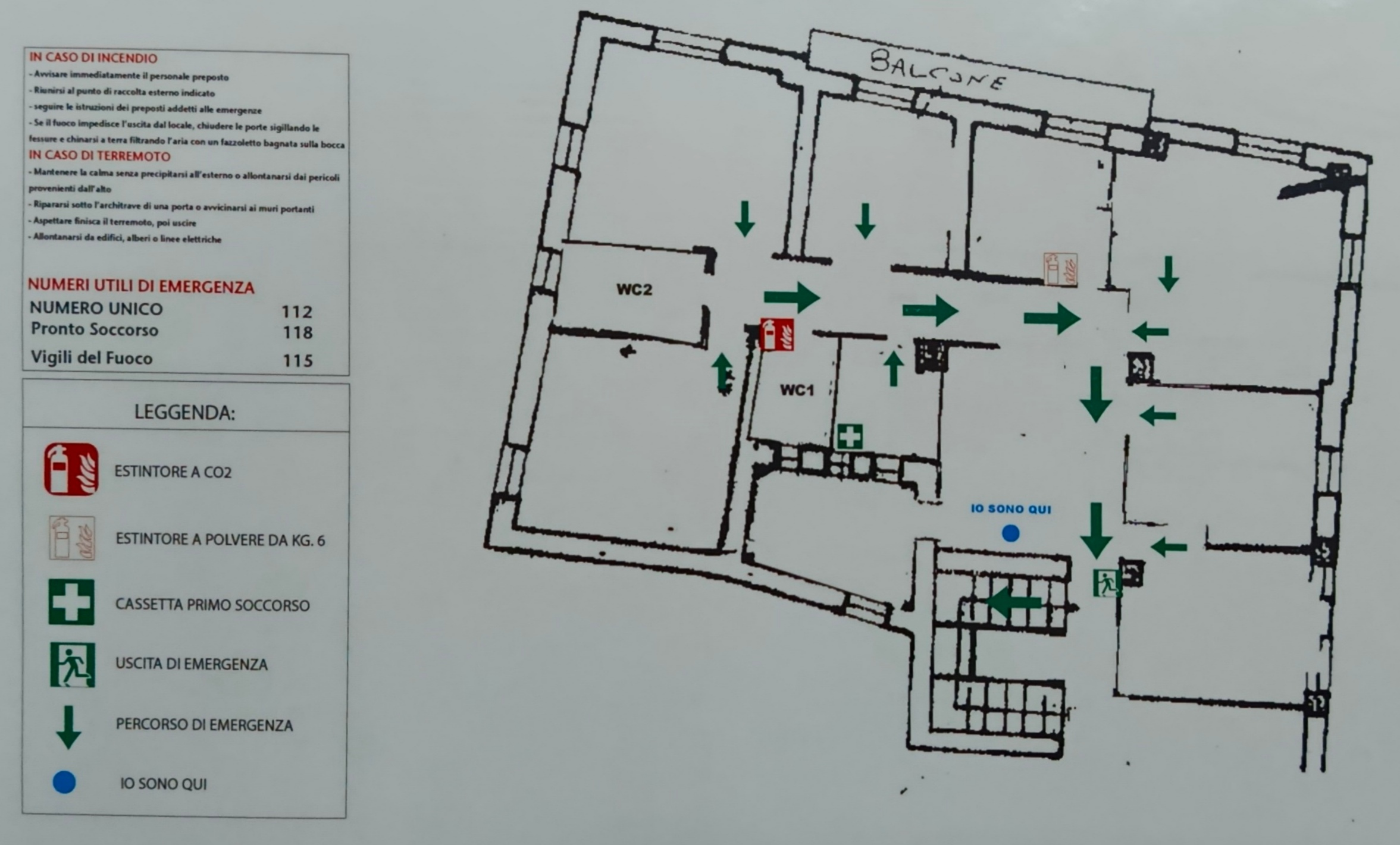
This safety plan of a small Italian business provides information regarding emergency instructions (earthquake and fire), emergency telephone numbers, escape routes and locations of first aid box and fire exstinguishers.

Injuries cost businesses billions of dollars annually. Studies have shown how company acceptance and implementation of comprehensive safety and health management systems reduce incidents, insurance costs, and workers' compensation claims. New technologies, like wearable safety devices and available online safety training, continue to be developed to encourage employers to invest in protection beyond the "canary in the coal mine" and reduce the cost to businesses of protecting their employees.

=== Sales ===
Sales are activity related to selling or the number of goods or services sold in a given time period. Sales are often integrated with all lines of business and are key to a companies' success.

== Management ==
The efficient and effective operation of a business, and study of this subject, is called management. The major branches of management are financial management, marketing management, human resource management, strategic management, production management, operations management, service management, inventory management, and information technology management.

Owners may manage their businesses themselves, or employ managers to do so for them. Whether they are owners or employees, managers administer three primary components of the business's value: financial resources, capital (tangible resources), and human resources.

=== Restructuring state enterprises ===
In recent decades, states modeled some of their assets and enterprises after business enterprises. In 2003, for example, China modeled 80% of its state-owned enterprises on a company-type management system. Many state institutions and enterprises in China and Russia have transformed into joint-stock companies, with part of their shares being listed on public stock markets.

=== Business process management ===
Business process management (BPM) is a holistic management approach focused on aligning all aspects of an organization with the wants and needs of clients. BPM attempts to improve processes continuously. It can, therefore, be described as a "process optimization process". It is argued that BPM enables organizations to be more efficient, effective and capable of change than a functionally focused, traditional hierarchical management approach.

== Business organization ==
Time required to start a business in 2017

The major factors affecting how a business is organized are usually:

- The size and scope of the business firm and its structure, management, and ownership, broadly analyzed in the theory of the firm. Generally, a smaller business is more flexible, while larger businesses, or those with wider ownership or more formal structures, will usually tend to be organized as corporations or (less often) partnerships. In addition, a business that wishes to raise money on a stock market or to be owned by a wide range of people will often be required to adopt a specific legal form to do so.
- The sector and country. Private profit-making businesses are different from government-owned bodies. In some countries, certain businesses are legally obliged to be organized in certain ways.
- Tax advantages. Different structures are treated differently in tax law and may have advantages for this reason.
- Disclosure and compliance requirements. Different business structures may be required to make less or more information public (or report it to relevant authorities) and may be bound to comply with different rules and regulations.
- Control and coordination requirements. In function of the risk and complexity of the tasks to organize, a business is organized through a set of formal and informal mechanisms. In particular, contractual and relational governance can help mitigate opportunism as well as support communication and information sharing.

Many businesses are operated through a separate entity such as a corporation or a partnership (either formed with or without limited liability). Most legal jurisdictions allow people to organize such an entity by filing certain charter documents with the relevant Secretary of State or equivalent and complying with certain other ongoing obligations. The relationships and legal rights of shareholders, limited partners, or members are governed partly by the charter documents and partly by the law of the jurisdiction where the entity is organized. Generally speaking, shareholders in a corporation, limited partners in a limited partnership, and members in a limited liability company are shielded from personal liability for the debts and obligations of the entity, which is legally treated as a separate "person". This means that unless there is misconduct, the owner's own possessions are strongly protected in law if the business does not succeed.

Where two or more individuals own a business together but have failed to organize a more specialized form of vehicle, they will be treated as a general partnership. The terms of a partnership are partly governed by a partnership agreement if one is created, and partly by the law of the jurisdiction where the partnership is located. No paperwork or filing is necessary to create a partnership, and without an agreement, the relationships and legal rights of the partners will be entirely governed by the law of the jurisdiction where the partnership is located. A single person who owns and runs a business is commonly known as a sole proprietor, whether that person owns it directly or through a formally organized entity. Depending on the business needs, an adviser can decide what kind is proprietorship will be most suitable.

General partners in a partnership (other than a limited liability partnership), plus anyone who personally owns and operates a business without creating a separate legal entity, are personally liable for the debts and obligations of the business.

Generally, corporations are required to pay tax just like "real" people. In some tax systems, this can give rise to so-called double taxation, because first the corporation pays tax on the profit, and then when the corporation distributes its profits to its owners, individuals have to include dividends in their income when they complete their personal tax returns, at which point a second layer of income tax is imposed.

In most countries, there are laws that treat small corporations differently from large ones. They may be exempt from certain legal filing requirements or labor laws, have simplified procedures in specialized areas, and have simplified, advantageous, or slightly different tax treatment.

"Going public" through a process known as an initial public offering (IPO) means that part of the business will be owned by members of the public. This requires the organization as a distinct entity, to disclose information to the public, and adhering to a tighter set of laws and procedures. Most public entities are corporations that have sold shares, but increasingly there are also public LLCs that sell units (sometimes also called shares), and other more exotic entities as well, such as, for example, real estate investment trusts in the US, and unit trusts in the UK. A general partnership cannot "go public".

=== Capital ===
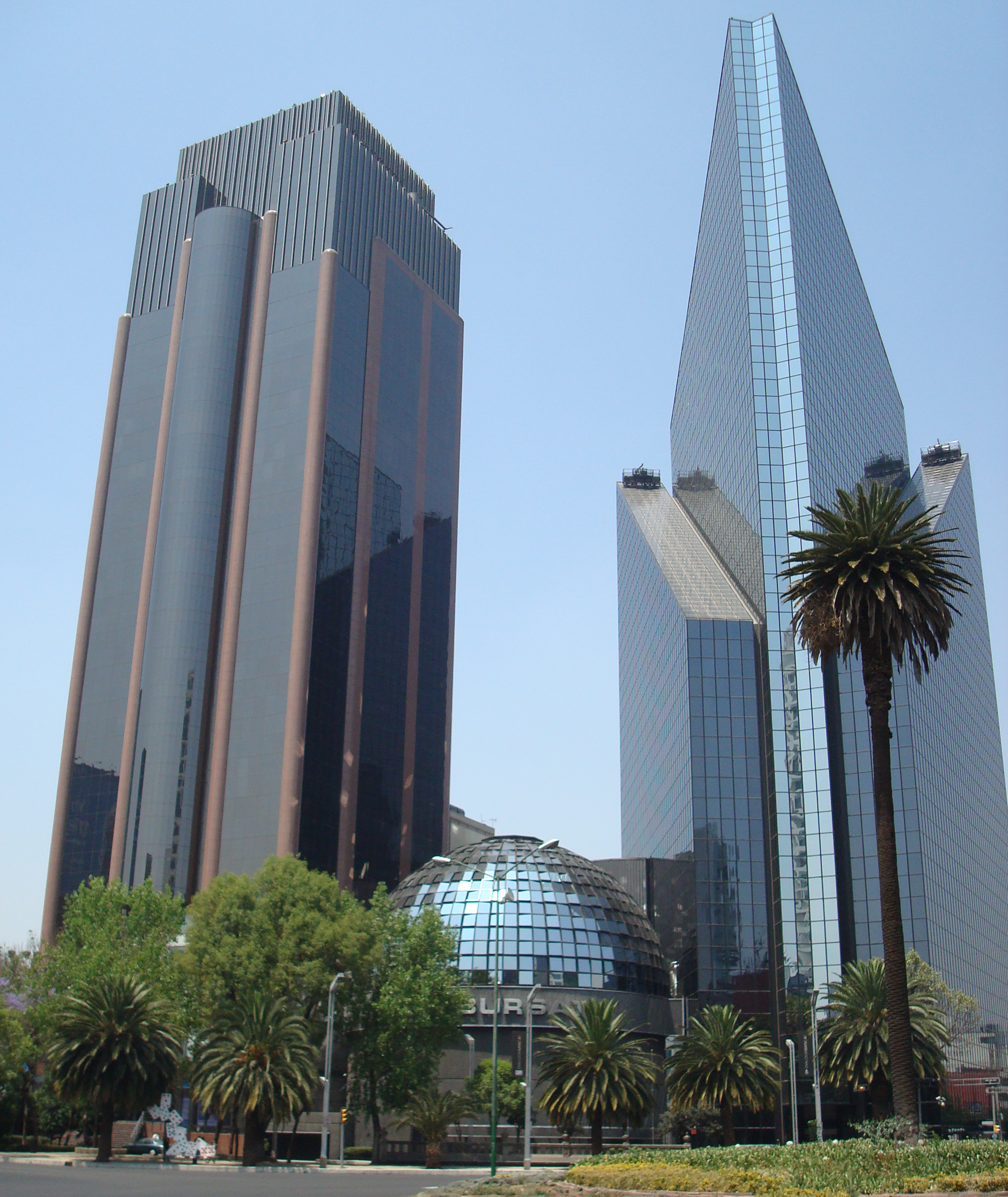
Mexican Stock Exchange in Paseo de la Reforma, Mexico City

When businesses need to raise money (called capital), they sometimes offer securities for sale.

Capital may be raised through private means, by an initial public offering or IPO on a stock exchange, or in multiple other ways.

Major stock exchanges include the Shanghai Stock Exchange, Singapore Exchange, Hong Kong Stock Exchange, New York Stock Exchange and NASDAQ (the US), the London Stock Exchange (UK), the Tokyo Stock Exchange (Japan), and Bombay Stock Exchange (India). Most countries with capital markets have at least one.

Other types of capital sourcing include crowdsourcing on the Internet, venture capital, bank loans, and debentures.

=== Intellectual property ===
Businesses often have important "intellectual property" that needs protection from competitors for the company to stay profitable. This could require patents, copyrights, trademarks, or preservation of trade secrets. Most businesses have names, logos, and similar branding techniques that could benefit from trademarking. Patents and copyrights in the United States are largely governed by federal law, while trade secrets and trademarking are mostly a matter of state law. Because of the nature of intellectual property, a business needs protection in every jurisdiction in which they are concerned about competitors. Many countries are signatories to international treaties concerning intellectual property, and thus companies registered in these countries are subject to national laws bound by these treaties. In order to protect trade secrets, companies may require employees to sign noncompete clauses which will impose limitations on an employee's interactions with stakeholders, and competitors.

== Business regulation and commercial law ==
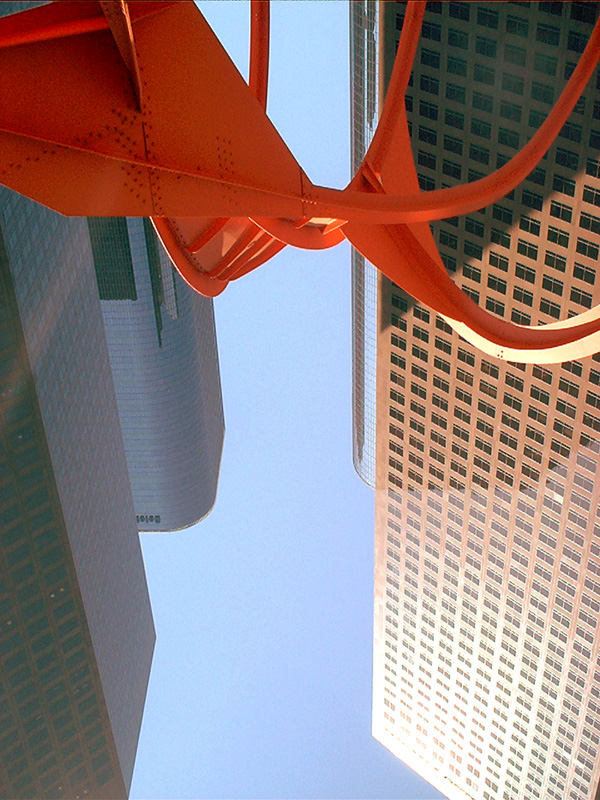
Offices in the Los Angeles Downtown Financial District

Most legal jurisdictions specify the forms of ownership that a business can adopt and establish the rules governing dealings among individuals, companies, and other entities, thereby creating a body of commercial law applicable to business affairs.

A very detailed and well-established body of rules that evolved over a very long period of time applies to commercial dealings. The need to regulate trade and commerce and resolve business disputes helped shape the creation of law and courts. The Code of Hammurabi dates back to about 1772 BC for example and contains provisions that relate, among other matters, to shipping costs and dealings between merchants and brokers. The word "corporation" derives from the Latin corpus, meaning body, and the Maurya Empire in Iron-Age India accorded legal rights to business entities.

In many countries, it is difficult to compile all the laws that can affect a business into a single reference source. Laws can govern the treatment of labour and employee relations, worker protection and safety, discrimination on the basis of age, gender, disability, race, and in some jurisdictions, sexual orientation, and the minimum wage, as well as unions, worker compensation, and working hours and leave.

Regulations apply to many aspects of business operations including business organization, customer relations and data protection. Some specialized businesses may also require licenses, either due to laws governing entry into certain trades, occupations or professions, that require special education or to raise revenue for local governments. Professions that require special licenses include law, medicine, piloting aircraft, selling liquor, radio broadcasting, selling investment securities, selling used cars, and roofing. Local jurisdictions may also require special licenses and taxes just to operate a business. In some cases, governments endeavour to reduce or simplify their business regulation regime, for example in Denmark the Danish Business Authority acts for the government in operating a number of initiatives designed to simplify the rules affecting business.

Some businesses are subject to ongoing special regulation, for example, public utilities, investment securities, banking, insurance, broadcasting, aviation, and health care providers. Environmental regulations are also very complex and can affect many businesses.

Businesses that have gone public are subject to regulations concerning their internal governance, such as how executive officers' compensation is determined, and when and how information is disclosed to shareholders and to the public. In the United States, these regulations are primarily implemented and enforced by the United States Securities and Exchange Commission (SEC). Other western nations have comparable regulatory bodies. The regulations are implemented and enforced by the China Securities Regulation Commission (CSRC) in China. In Singapore, the regulatory authority is the Monetary Authority of Singapore (MAS), and in Hong Kong, it is the Securities and Futures Commission (SFC).

The proliferation and increasing complexity of the laws governing business have forced increasing specialization in corporate law. It is not unheard of for certain kinds of corporate transactions to require a team of five to ten attorneys due to sprawling regulation. Commercial law spans general corporate law, employment and labor law, health-care law, securities law, mergers and acquisitions, tax law, employee benefit plans, food and drug regulation, intellectual property law on copyrights, patents, trademarks, telecommunications law, and financing.

== Exploitation of labour ==
Some businesses lobby for immigration of foreign workers which accept lower salaries than domestic workers.

A trade union (or labor union) is an organization of workers who have come together to achieve common goals such as protecting the integrity of its trade, improving safety standards, achieving higher pay and benefits such as health care and retirement, increasing the number of employees an employer assigns to complete the work, and better working conditions. The trade union, through its leadership, bargains with the employer on behalf of union members (rank and file members) and negotiates labor contracts (collective bargaining) with employers. The most common purpose of these associations or unions is "maintaining or improving the conditions of their employment". This may include the negotiation of wages, work rules, complaint procedures, rules governing hiring, firing, and promotion of workers, benefits, workplace safety and policies.

== See also ==
- Accounting
  - List of accounting topics
- Advertising
- Bank
- Big business
- Business acumen
- Business broker
- Business ethics
  - Social responsibility
- Business hours
- Business law topics
- Business mathematics
- Business mediator
- Business school
- Business tourism
- Business valuation
- Businessperson
- Capitalism
- Change management analyst
- Commerce
- Company
- Corporate personhood
- Cost overrun
- E-commerce
  - Electronic business
- Economics
  - Economic democracy
  - Financial economics
  - List of economics topics
- Entrepreneurship
- Finance
  - List of finance topics
- Franchising
- Government ownership
- Human resources
- Industry categories
- Innovation
- Insurance
- Intellectual property
- Interim management
- International trade
  - List of international trade topics
- Investment
- Job creation program
- Labour economics
- Limited liability
- List of company registers
- List of largest employers
- List of oldest companies
- Lists of companies
- Management information system
- Manufacturing
  - List of production topics
- Marketing
  - List of marketing topics
- Money
- Organizational studies
- Profit
- Real estate
  - List of real estate topics
- Revenue shortfall
- Shareholder value
- Small business
- Strategic management
- Strategic planning
- Tax
- Trade
- Types of business entity
