= Indigo (color) =

Color between blue and violet

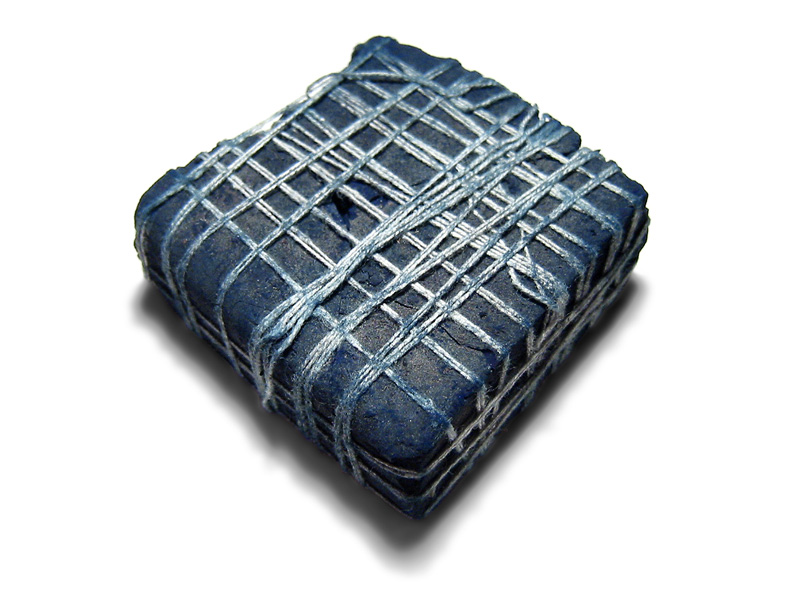
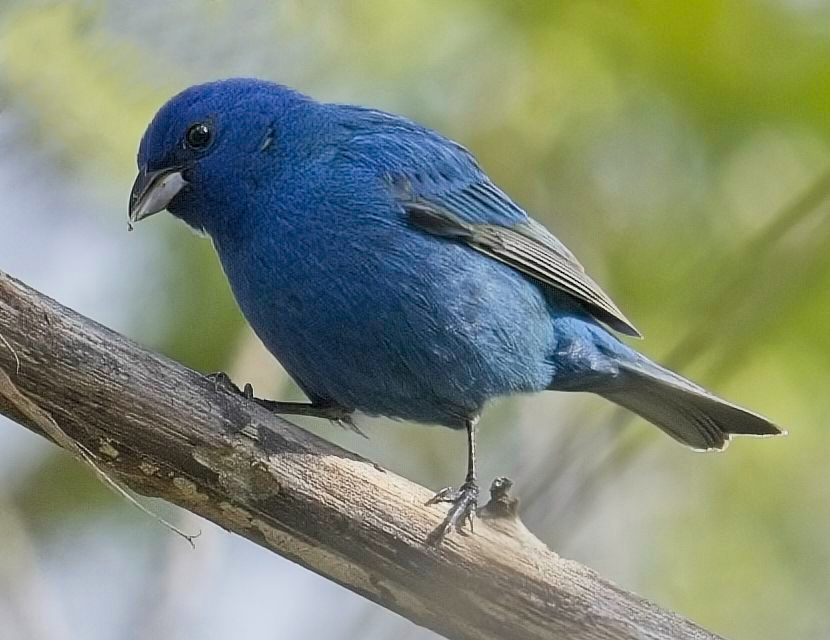
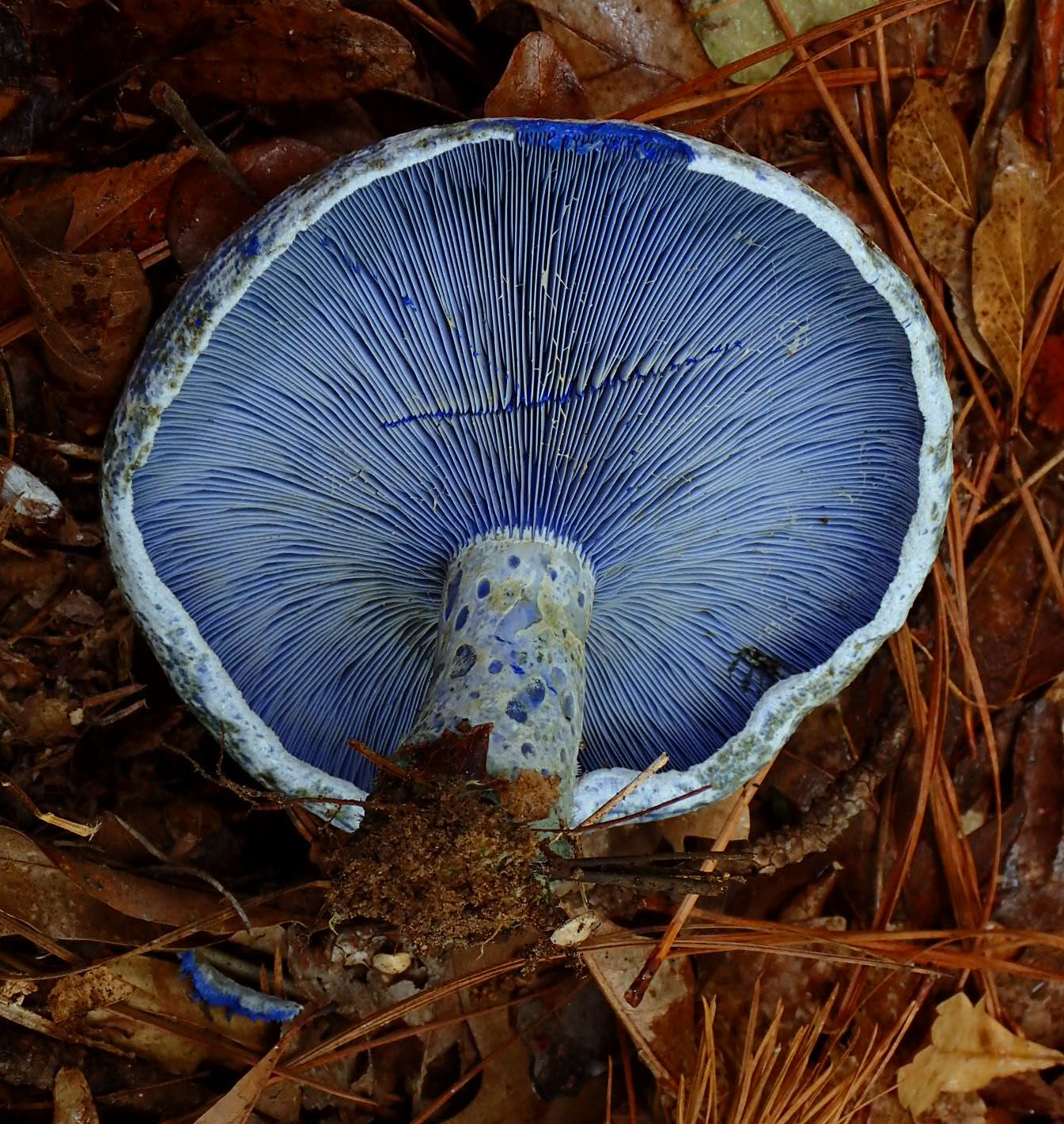
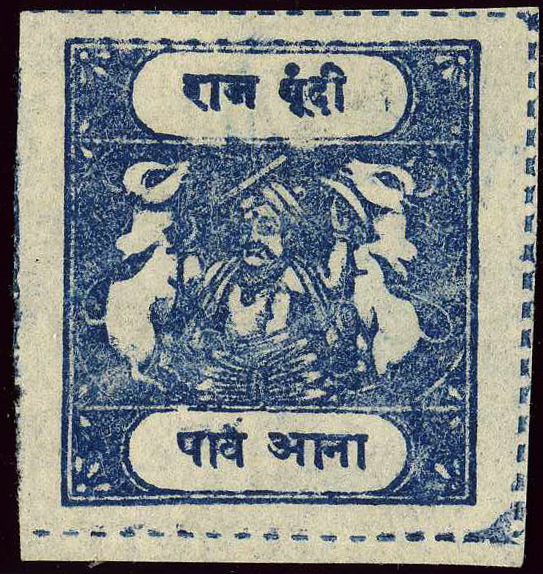
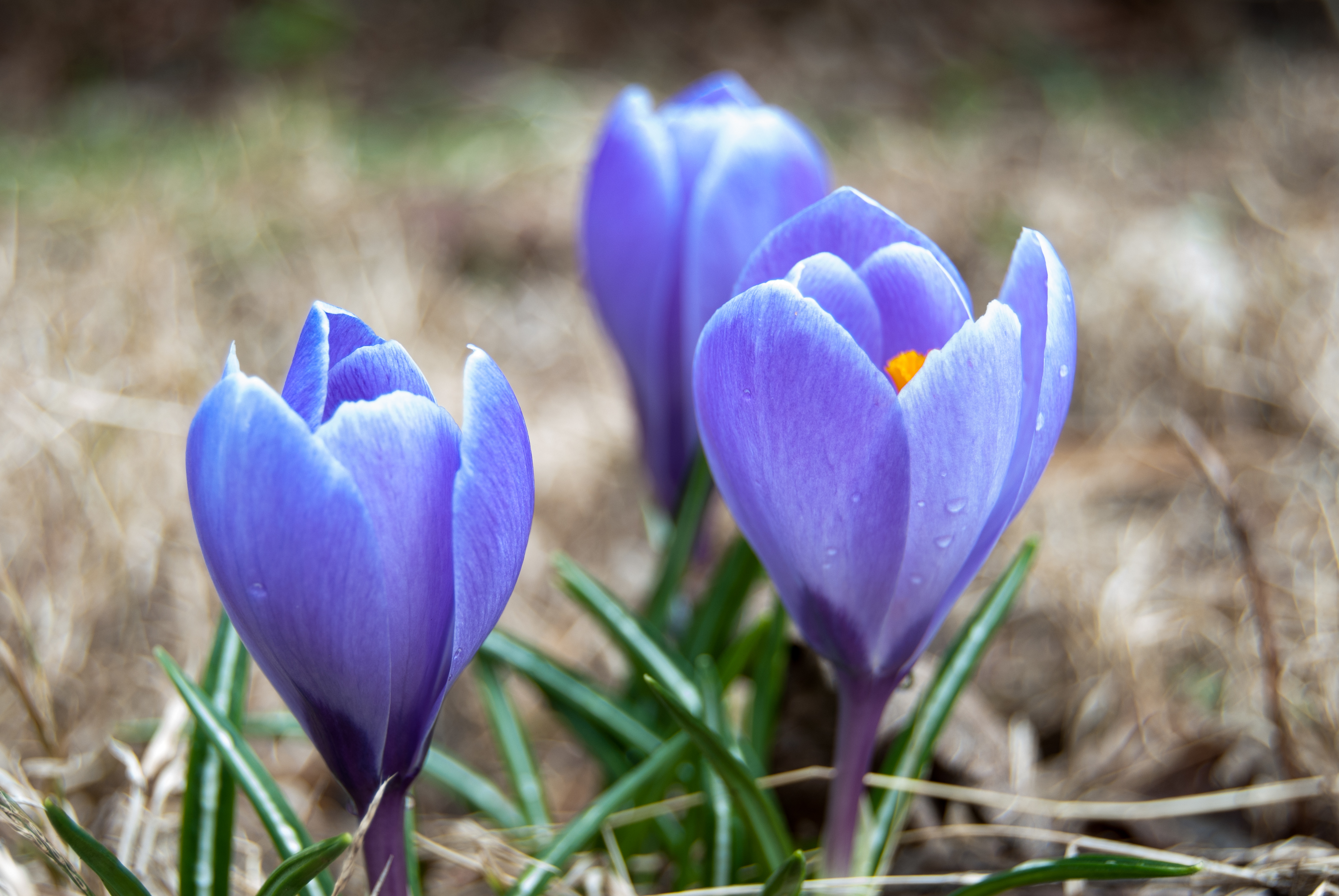
- Clockwise, from top left: Plant dye from India; Passerina cyanea; a 1923 Bundi State stamp; crocuses; Lactarius indigo.

Spectral coordinates
- Wavelength: 420–450 nm
- Frequency: ≈714–670 THz

Color coordinates
- Hex triplet: #4000FF
- sRGB^{B} (r, g, b): (64, 0, 255)
- HSV (h, s, v): (255°, 100%, 100%)
- CIELCh_{uv} (L, C, h): (35, 133, 268°)
- Source: CIECAM16 248:2022
- ISCC–NBS descriptor: Vivid purplish blue
- B: Normalized to [0–255] (byte)

Indigo is a term used for a number of hues in the region of blue to violet. The word comes from the ancient dye of the same name. The term "indigo" can refer to the color of the dye, various colors of fabric dyed with indigo dye, a spectral color, one of the seven colors of the rainbow as described by Sir Isaac Newton, or a region on the color wheel, and can include various shades of blue, ultramarine, and green-blue. Since the web era, the term has also been used for various purple and violet hues identified as "indigo", based on use of the term "indigo" in HTML web page specifications.

The word "indigo" comes from the Latin word indicum, meaning "Indian", as the naturally based dye was originally exported to Europe from India.

The Early Modern English word indigo referred to the dye, not to the color (hue) itself, and indigo is not traditionally part of the basic color-naming system.

The first known recorded use of indigo as a color name in English was in 1289. Due to the extensive knowledge of indigo cultivation by enslaved West Africans, indigo became a major cash crop in the American colonies.

Newton regarded indigo as a color in the visible spectrum, as well as one of the seven colors of the rainbow: the color between blue and violet; however, sources differ as to its actual position in the electromagnetic spectrum. Some later scientists have concluded that what Newton called "blue" was what is now called cyan or blue-green; and what Newton called "indigo" was what is now called blue. However, other scholars reject this.

In the 1980s, programmers produced a somewhat arbitrary list of color names for the X Window computer operating system, resulting in the HTML and CSS specifications issued in the 1990s using the term "indigo" for a dark purple hue. This has resulted in violet and purple hues also being associated with the term "indigo" since that time.

Because of the Abney effect, pinpointing indigo to a specific hue value in the HSV color wheel is elusive, as a higher HSV saturation value shifts the hue towards blue. However, on the new CIECAM16 standard, the hues values around 290° may be thought of as indigo, depending on the observer.

== History ==
=== Indigo as a dye ===
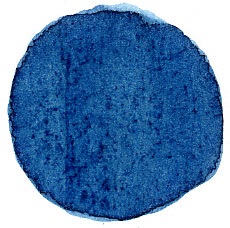
Extract of natural indigo applied to paper

Indigo dye is a blue color, obtained from several different types of plants. The indigo plant (Indigofera tinctoria) often called "true indigo" probably produces the best results, although several others are close in color: Japanese indigo (Polygonum tinctoria), Natal indigo (Indigofera arrecta), Guatemalan indigo (Indigofera suffruticosa), Chinese indigo (Persicaria tinctoria), and woad (Isatis tinctoria).

Indigofera tinctoria and related species were cultivated in West Africa, East Asia, Egypt, India, Bangladesh and Peru in antiquity. The earliest direct evidence for the use of indigo dates to around 4000 BC and comes from Huaca Prieta, in contemporary Peru. Pliny the Elder mentions India as the source of the dye after which it was named. It was imported from there in small quantities via the Silk Road.

The Ancient Greek term for the dye was Ἰνδικὸν φάρμακον (indikon pharmakon, "Indian dye"), which, adopted to Latin as indicum (a second declension noun) or indico (oblique case) and via Portuguese, gave rise to the modern word indigo.

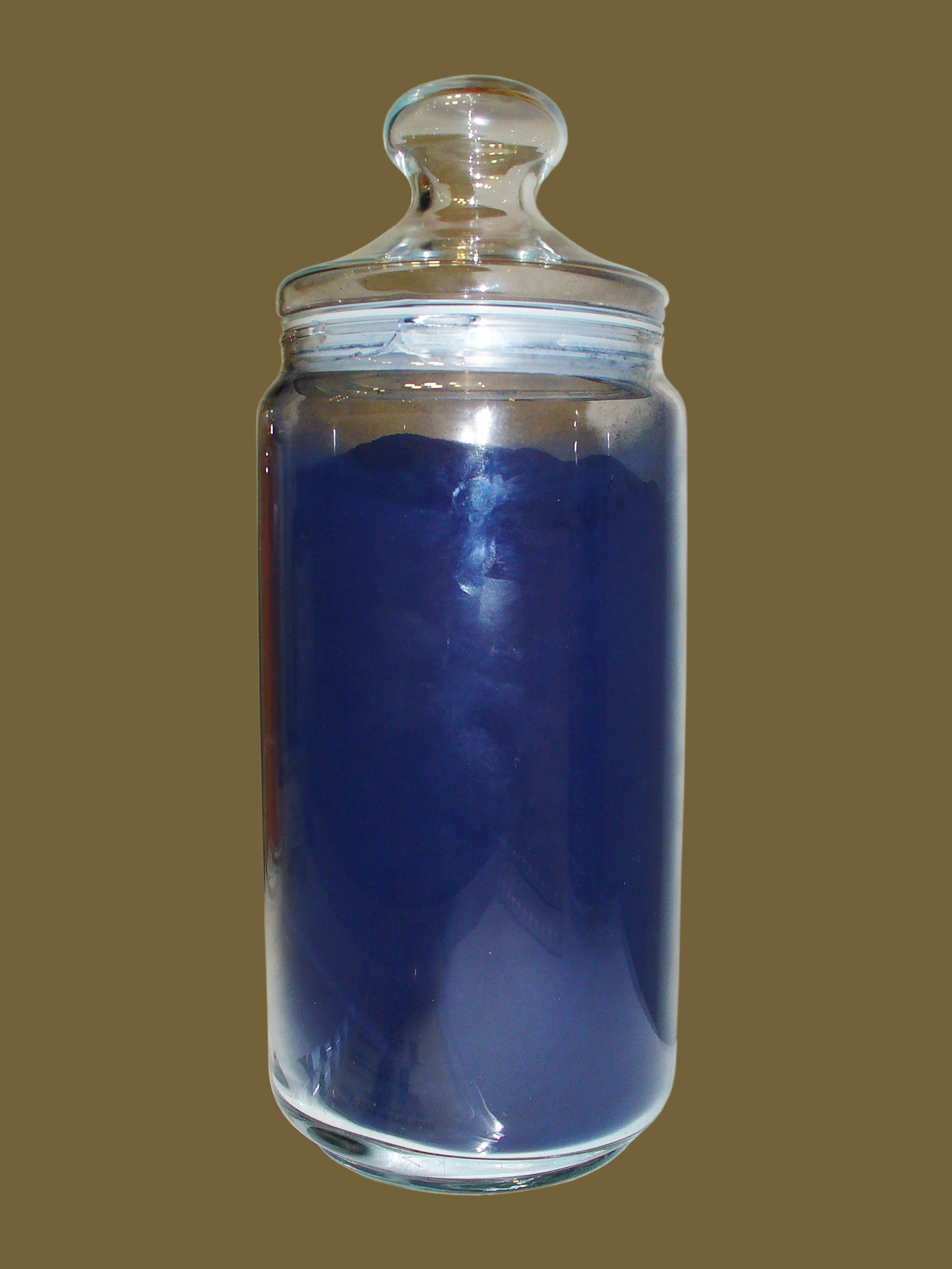
Indigo extracted from woad

In early Europe, the main source was from the woad plant Isatis tinctoria, also known as pastel. For a long time, woad was the main source of blue dye in Europe. Woad was replaced by "true indigo", as trade routes opened up. Plant sources have now been largely replaced by synthetic dyes.

Spanish explorers discovered an American species of indigo and began to cultivate the product in Guatemala. The English and French subsequently began to encourage indigo cultivation in their colonies in the West Indies.

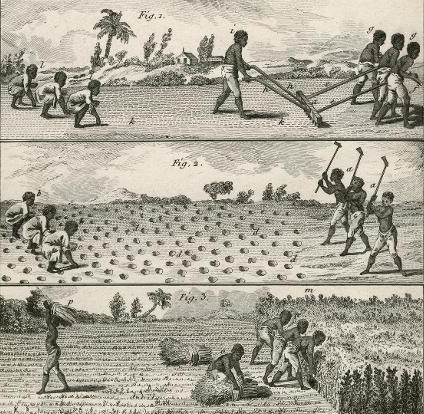
Enslaved Africans cultivating indigo in a plantation, c.1770

In North America, indigo is native to the coastal regions of the American South and was cultivated as early as 1622. Eliza Lucas, whose father sent her indigo seeds as a gift, is credited with introducing the plant to the southern colonies. However, it was enslaved West Africans from present-day Mali, Guinea, Ivory Coast, Senegal, and Nigeria who actually cultivated those indigo seeds and introduced indigo to North America in the form of dye, where it became the colony's second-most important cash crop (after rice). Before the Revolutionary War, indigo accounted for more than one-third of the value of exports from the American colonies.

=== Isaac Newton's classification of indigo as a spectral color ===
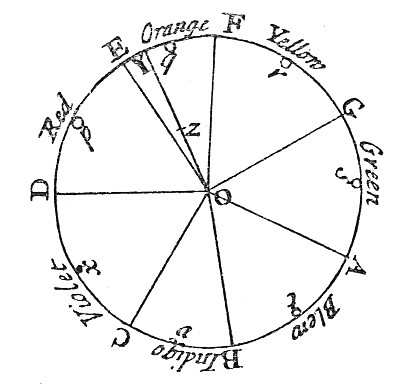
Indigo is one of the colors on Newton's color wheel.

Newton introduced indigo as one of the seven base colors of his work. In the mid-1660s, when Newton bought a pair of prisms at a fair near Cambridge, the East India Company had begun importing indigo dye into England, supplanting the homegrown woad as source of blue dye. In a pivotal experiment in the history of optics, the young Newton shone a narrow beam of sunlight through a prism to produce a rainbow-like band of colors on the wall. In describing this optical spectrum, Newton acknowledged that the spectrum had a continuum of colors, but named seven: "The originall or primary colours are Red, yellow, Green, Blew, & a violet purple; together with Orang, Indico, & an indefinite varietie of intermediate gradations." He linked the seven prismatic colors to the seven notes of a western major scale, as shown in his color wheel, with orange and indigo as the semitones. Having decided upon seven colors, he asked a friend to repeatedly divide up the spectrum that was projected from the prism onto the wall:

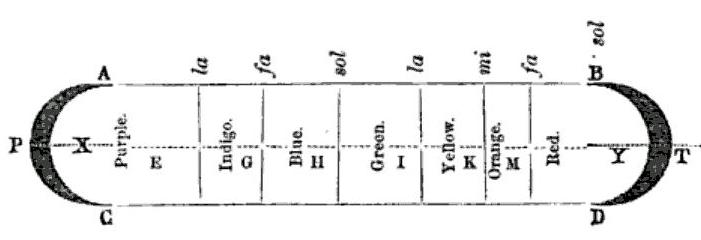
Newton's observation of prismatic colors: Comparing this to a color image of the visible light spectrum shows that "blue" corresponds to cyan, while "indigo" corresponds to blue.

I desired a friend to draw with a pencil lines cross the image, or pillar of colours, where every one of the seven aforenamed colours was most full and brisk, and also where he judged the truest confines of them to be, whilst I held the paper so, that the said image might fall within a certain compass marked on it. And this I did, partly because my own eyes are not very critical in distinguishing colours, partly because another, to whom I had not communicated my thoughts about this matter, could have nothing but his eyes to determine his fancy in making those marks.

The traditional seven colors of the rainbow

Indigo is therefore counted as one of the traditional colors of the rainbow, the order of which is given by the mnemonics "Richard of York gave battle in vain" and Roy G. Biv. James Clerk Maxwell and Hermann von Helmholtz accepted indigo as an appropriate name for the color flanking violet in the spectrum.

Later scientists concluded that Newton named the colors differently from current usage. According to Gary Waldman, "A careful reading of Newton's work indicates that the color he called indigo, we would normally call blue; his blue is then what we would name blue-green or cyan." If this is true, Newton's seven spectral colors would have been:

Red: Orange: Yellow: Green: Blue: Indigo: Violet:

However, other scholars reject this.

According to Isaac Asimov, "It is customary to list indigo as a color lying between blue and violet, but it has never seemed to me that indigo is worth the dignity of being considered a separate color. To my eyes, it seems merely deep blue."

=== 1800s ===
In 1821, Abraham Werner published Werner's Nomenclature of Colours, where indigo, called indigo blue, is classified as a blue hue, and not listed among the violet hues. He writes that the color is composed of "Berlin blue, a little black, and a small portion of apple green," and indicating it is the color of blue copper ore, with Berlin blue being described as the color of a blue jay's wing, a hepatica flower, or a blue sapphire.

According to an article, Definition of the Color Indigo published in Nature magazine in the late 1800s, Newton's use of the term "indigo" referred to a spectral color between blue and violet. However, the article states that Wilhelm von Bezold, in his treatise on color, disagreed with Newton's use of the term, on the basis that the pigment indigo was a darker hue than the spectral color; and furthermore, Professor Ogden Rood points out that indigo pigment corresponds to the cyan-blue region of the spectrum, lying between blue and green, although darker in hue. Rood considers that artificial ultramarine pigment is closer to the point of the spectrum described as "indigo", and proposed renaming that spectral point as "ultramarine". The article goes on to state that comparison of the pigments, both dry and wet, with Maxwell's discs and with the spectrum, that indigo is almost identical to Prussian blue, stating that it "certainly does not lie on the violet side of 'blue.'" When scraped, a lump of indigo pigment appears more violet, and if powdered or dissolved, becomes greenish.

=== Modern spectral classification ===
Several modern sources place indigo in the electromagnetic spectrum between 420 and 450 nanometers, which lies on the short-wave side of color wheel (RGB) blue, towards (spectral) violet.

The correspondence of this definition with colors of actual indigo dyes, though, is disputed. Optical scientists Hardy and Perrin list indigo as between 445 and 464 nm wavelength, which occupies a spectrum segment from roughly the color wheel (RGB) blue extending to the long-wave side, towards azure.

Other modern color scientists, such as Bohren and Clothiaux (2006), and J.W.G. Hunt (1980), divide the spectrum between violet and blue at about 450 nm, with no hue specifically named indigo.

=== Web era ===
==== Origin of "Indigo" as a name for purple in web pages ====
Towards the end of the 20th century, purple colors also became referred to as "indigo". In the 1980s, computer programmers Jim Gettys, Paul Ravelling, John C. Thomas and Jim Fulton produced a list of colors for the X Window Operating System. The color identified as "indigo" was not the color indigo (as generally understood at the time), but was actually a dark purple hue; the programmers assigned it the hex code #4B0082 . This collection of color names was somewhat arbitrary: Thomas used a box of 72 Crayola crayons as a standard, whereas Ravelling used color swabs from the now-defunct Sinclair Paints company, resulting in the color list for version X11 of the operating system containing fanciful color names such as "papaya whip", "blanched almond" and "peach puff". The database was also criticised for its many inconsistencies, such as "dark gray" being lighter than "gray", and for the color distribution being uneven, tending towards reds and greens at the expense of blues.

In the 1990s, this list which came with version X11 became the basis of the HTML and CSS color rendition used in websites and web design. This resulted in the name "Indigo" being associated with purple and violet hues in web page design and graphic design. Physics author John Spacey writes on the website Simplicable that the X11 programmers did not have any background in color theory, and that as these names are used by web designers and graphic designers, the name indigo has since that time been strongly associated with purple or violet. Spacey writes, "As such, a few programmers accidentally repurposed a color name that was known to civilisations for thousands of years."

==== Crayola crayon colors ====
The Crayola company released an indigo crayon in 1999, with the Crayola website using the hex code #4F49C6 to approximate the crayon color. The 2001 iron indigo crayon is portrayed using hex code #184FA1 . The 2004 indigo crayon color is depicted by #5D76CB , and the 2019 iridescent indigo is portrayed by #3C32CD .

== Shades and variations ==
Like many other colors (orange, rose, and violet are the best-known), indigo gets its name from an object in the natural world—the plant named indigo once used for dyeing cloth (see also Indigo dye).

The color pigment indigo is equivalent to the web color indigo and approximates the color indigo that is usually reproduced in pigments and colored pencils.

The color of indigo dye is a different color from either spectrum indigo or pigment indigo. This is the actual color of the dye. A vat full of this dye is a darker color, approximating the web color midnight blue.

The color "electric indigo" is a bright and saturated color between the traditional indigo and violet. This is the brightest color indigo that can be approximated on a computer screen; it is a color located between the (primary) blue and the color violet of the RGB color wheel.

The web color blue violet or deep indigo is a tone of indigo brighter than pigment indigo, but not as bright as electric indigo.

Listed below are several indigo hues, some of which have included the word "indigo", with the adoption of HTML color names in the World Wide Web era.

=== Indigo dye color ===
Indigo Dye

Color coordinates
- Hex triplet: #00416A
- sRGB^{B} (r, g, b): (0, 65, 106)
- HSV (h, s, v): (203°, 100%, 42%)
- CIELCh_{uv} (L, C, h): (26, 40, 246°)
- ISCC–NBS descriptor: Deep blue
- B: Normalized to [0–255] (byte)

Indigo dye is a greenish dark blue color, obtained from either the leaves of the tropical Indigo plant (Indigofera), or from woad (Isatis tinctoria), or the Chinese indigo (Persicaria tinctoria). Many societies make use of the Indigofera plant for producing different shades of blue. Cloth that is repeatedly boiled in an indigo dye bath-solution (boiled and left to dry, boiled and left to dry, etc.), the blue pigment becomes darker on the cloth. After dyeing, the cloth is hung in the open air to dry.

A Native American woman described the process used by the Cherokee Indians when extracting the dye:

We raised our indigo which we cut in the morning while the dew was still on it; then we put it in a tub and soaked it overnight, and the next day we foamed it up by beating it with a gourd. We let it stand overnight again, and the next day rubbed tallow on our hands to kill the foam. Afterwards, we poured the water off, and the sediment left in the bottom we would pour into a pitcher or crock to let it get dry, and then we would put it into a poke made of cloth (i.e. sack made of coarse cloth) and then when we wanted any of it to dye [there]with, we would take the dry indigo.

In Sa Pa, Vietnam, the tropical Indigo (Indigo tinctoria) leaves are harvested and, while still fresh, placed inside a tub of room-temperature to lukewarm water where they are left to sit for 3 to 4 days and allowed to ferment, until the water turns green. Afterwards, crushed limestone (pickling lime) is added to the water, at which time the water with the leaves are vigorously agitated for 15 to 20 minutes, until the water turns blue. The blue pigment settles as sediment at the bottom of the tub. The sediment is scooped out and stored. When dyeing cloth, the pigment is then boiled in a vat of water; the cloth (usually made from yarns of hemp) is inserted into the vat for absorbing the dye. After hanging out to dry, the boiling process is repeated as often as needed to produce a darker color.

=== Indigo (color wheel) ===
Indigo (color wheel)

Color coordinates
- Hex triplet: #4000FF
- sRGB^{B} (r, g, b): (64, 0, 255)
- HSV (h, s, v): (255°, 100%, 100%)
- CIELCh_{uv} (L, C, h): (35, 133, 268°)
- ISCC–NBS descriptor: Vivid purplish blue
- B: Normalized to [0–255] (byte)

In an RGB color space, "Indigo" is composed of 25.1% red, 0% green and 100% blue (a blue-to-red ratio of approximately 4:1). In a CMYK color space, it is composed of 74.9% cyan, 100% magenta, 0% yellow and 0% black. It has a hue angle of 255.1 degrees, a saturation of 100% and a lightness of 50%. Indigo can be obtained by blending violet with blue. A nearly identical color is electric ultramarine.

=== Electric indigo ===
Electric Indigo

Color coordinates
- Hex triplet: #6F00FF
- sRGB^{B} (r, g, b): (111, 0, 255)
- HSV (h, s, v): (266°, 100%, 100%)
- CIELCh_{uv} (L, C, h): (39, 134, 273°)
- ISCC–NBS descriptor: Vivid purplish blue
- B: Normalized to [0–255] (byte)

"Electric indigo" is brighter than the pigment indigo reproduced above. When plotted on the CIE chromaticity diagram, this color is at 435 nanometers, in the middle of the portion of the spectrum traditionally considered indigo, i.e., between 450 and 420 nanometers. This color is only an approximation of spectral indigo, since actual spectral colors are outside the gamut of the sRGB color system.

=== Deep indigo (web color blue-violet) ===
Blue-Violet

Color coordinates
- Hex triplet: #8A2BE2
- sRGB^{B} (r, g, b): (138, 43, 226)
- HSV (h, s, v): (271°, 81%, 89%)
- CIELCh_{uv} (L, C, h): (42, 115, 279°)
- Source: X11
- ISCC–NBS descriptor: Vivid violet
- B: Normalized to [0–255] (byte)

The web color "blue-violet" is a color intermediate in brightness between electric indigo and pigment indigo. It is also known as "deep indigo".

=== Web color indigo ===
Web color Indigo

Color coordinates
- Hex triplet: #4B0082
- sRGB^{B} (r, g, b): (75, 0, 130)
- HSV (h, s, v): (275°, 100%, 51%)
- CIELCh_{uv} (L, C, h): (20, 62, 279°)
- Source: colorhexa.com
- ISCC–NBS descriptor: Dark violet
- B: Normalized to [0–255] (byte)

The web color indigo has a hue that is closer to violet than to indigo dye for which the color is named; see § Web era.

=== Web-safe indigo ===
Web-safe Indigo

Color coordinates
- Hex triplet: #330099
- sRGB^{B} (r, g, b): (51, 0, 153)
- HSV (h, s, v): (260°, 100%, 60%)
- CIELCh_{uv} (L, C, h): (20, 73, 270°)
- Source: rgbcolorcode.com
- B: Normalized to [0–255] (byte)

Web-safe indigo is similar to the indigo of a color wheel, though less intense, and uses a blue-to-red ratio of 3:1 instead of 4:1.

=== Tropical indigo ===
Tropical Indigo

Color coordinates
- Hex triplet: #9683EC
- sRGB^{B} (r, g, b): (150, 131, 236)
- HSV (h, s, v): (251°, 44%, 93%)
- CIELCh_{uv} (L, C, h): (61, 84, 271°)
- Source: Gallego and Sanz
- ISCC–NBS descriptor: Vivid violet
- B: Normalized to [0–255] (byte)

'Tropical Indigo' is the color that is called añil in the Guía de coloraciones (Guide to colorations) by Rosa Gallego and Juan Carlos Sanz, a color dictionary published in 2005 that is widely popular in the Hispanophone realm.

=== Imperial blue ===
Imperial Blue

Color coordinates
- Hex triplet: #002395
- sRGB^{B} (r, g, b): (0, 35, 149)
- HSV (h, s, v): (226°, 100%, 58%)
- CIELCh_{uv} (L, C, h): (21, 72, 263°)
- ISCC–NBS descriptor: Vivid blue
- B: Normalized to [0–255] (byte)

== In nature ==
=== Birds ===
- Male indigobirds are a very dark, metallic blue.
- The indigo bunting, native to North America, is mostly bright cerulean blue with an indigo head.
- The related blue grosbeak is, ironically, more indigo than the indigo bunting.

=== Fungi ===
- Lactarius indigo is one of the very few species of mushrooms colored in tones of blue.

=== Snakes ===
- The eastern indigo snake, Drymarchon couperi, of the southeastern United States, is a dark blue/black.
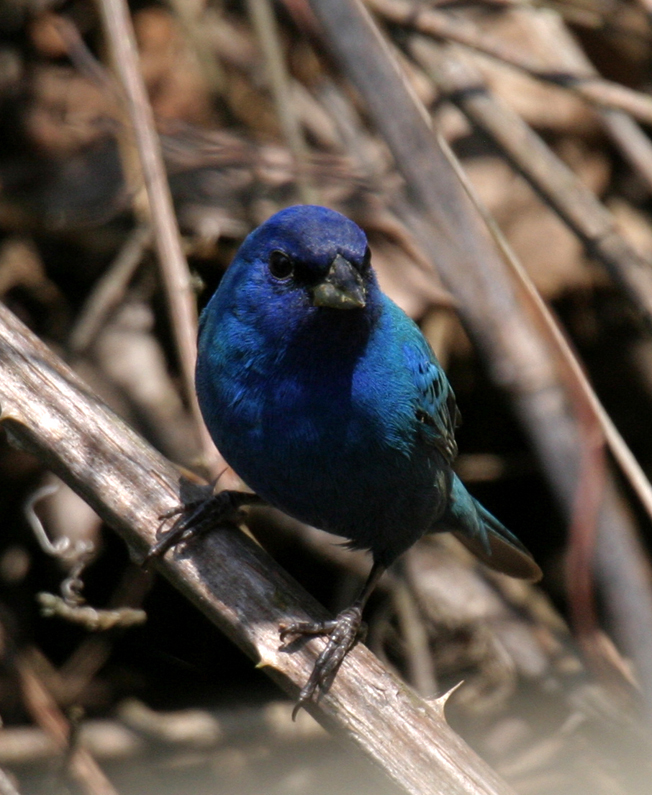
Indigo bunting

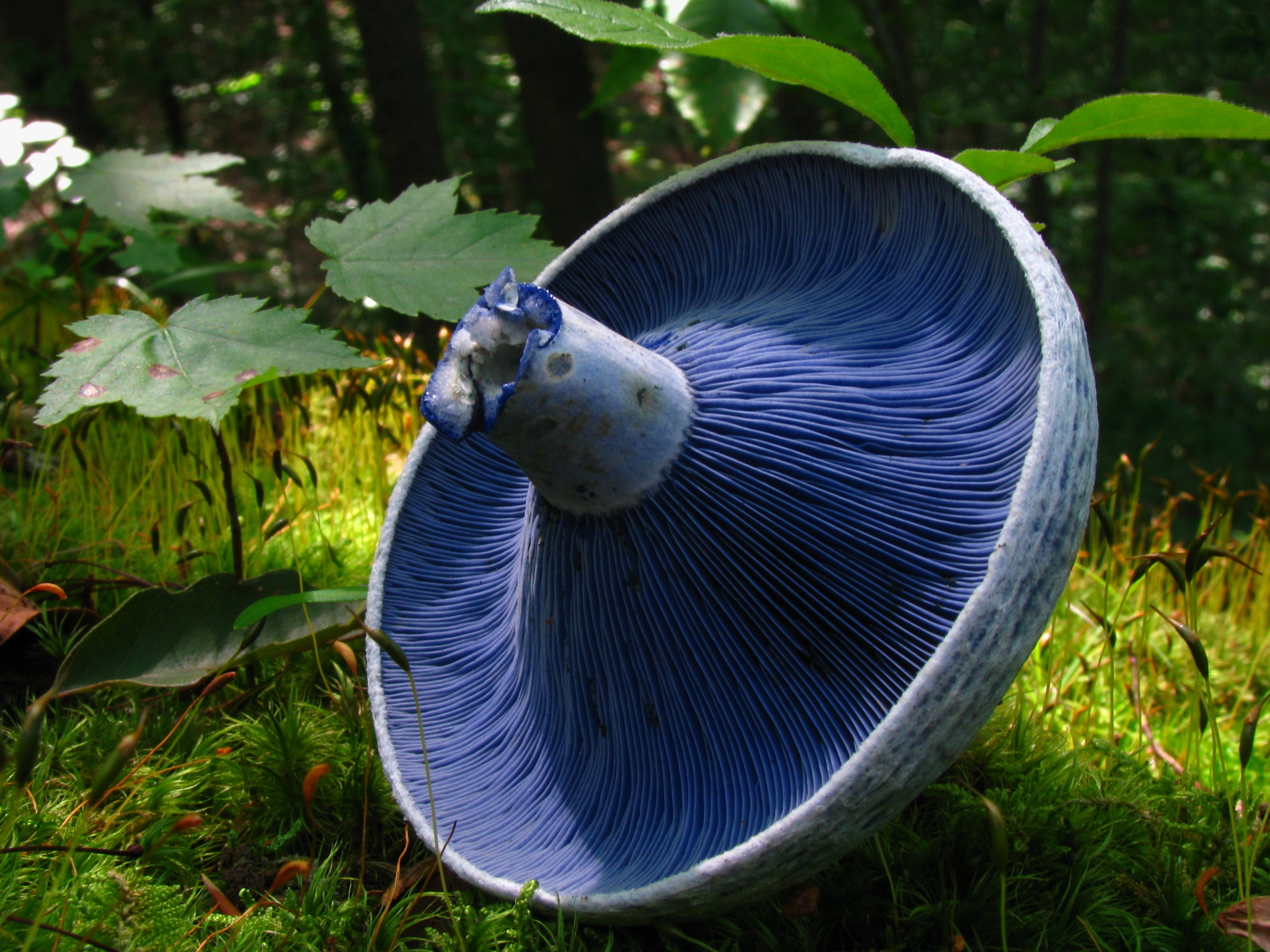
An upturned Lactarius indigo mushroom

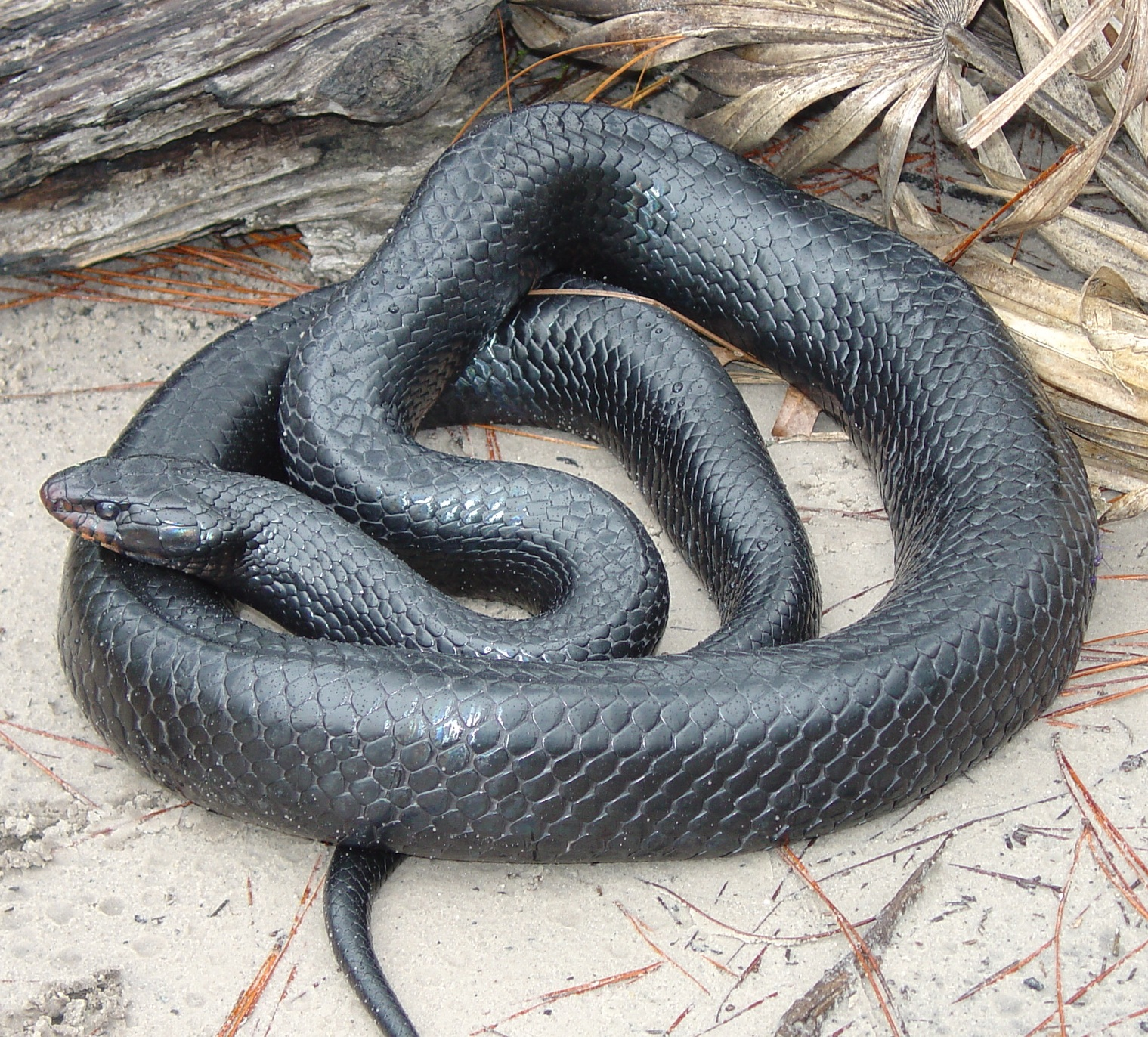
Eastern indigo snake

== In culture ==
=== Business ===
- IndiGo is an Indian budget airline that uses an indigo logo and operates only Airbus A320s.
- Indigo Books and Music uses an indigo logo and has sometimes referred to the color as "blue" in advertising.
- The GameCube was initially released in two color variants. One bore the title of 'Indigo', with the main console and controllers in that color.

=== Computer graphics ===
- Electric indigo is sometimes used as a glow color for computer graphics lighting, possibly because it seems to change color from indigo to lavender when blended with white.

=== Dyes ===
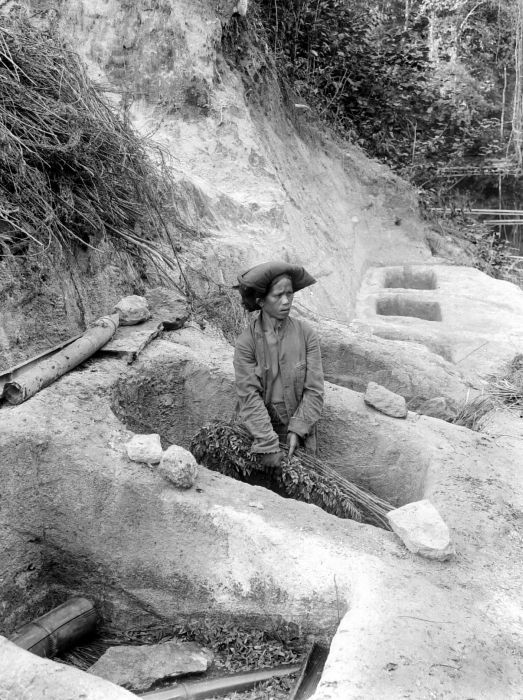
Indigo is created in potholes carved in pumice "tufgrond" in Karoland, Sumatra.

- Indigo dye was used to dye denim, giving the original 'blue jeans' their distinctive colour.
- The original Postal Worker uniform contained indigo dye, partly due to the dye not running when wet.
- Guatemala, as of 1778, was considered one of the world's foremost providers of indigo.
- In Mexico, indigo is known as añil. After silver, and cochineal to produce red, añil was the most important product exported by historical Mexico.
- The use of añil is survived in the Philippines, particularly in the Visayas and Mindanao. The powder dye is mixed with vinegar to be applied to the cheek of a person suffering from mumps.

=== Food ===
- Scientists discovered in 2008 that when a banana becomes ripe, it glows bright indigo under a black light. Some insects, as well as birds, see into the ultraviolet, because they are tetrachromats and can use this information to tell when a banana is ready to eat. The glow is the result of a chemical created as the green chlorophyll in the peel breaks down.

=== Literature ===
Marina Warner's novel Indigo (1992) is a retelling of Shakespeare's The Tempest and features the production of indigo dye by Sycorax.

=== Military ===
The French Army adopted dark blue indigo at the time of the French Revolution, as a replacement for the white uniforms previously worn by the Royal infantry regiments. In 1806, Napoleon decided to restore the white coats because of shortages of indigo dye imposed by the British continental blockade. However, the greater practicability of the blue color led to its retention, and indigo remained the dominant color of French military coats until 1914.

=== Spirituality ===
The spiritualist applications use electric indigo, because the color is positioned between blue and violet on the spectrum.

- In West and Central Africa, indigo has been cultivated for millennia and plays a significant roles in the traditional spiritual beliefs of the Bamileke, Yoruba, Baoulé, Dogon, Fon, and Aja peoples.
- The color electric indigo is used in New Age philosophy to symbolically represent the sixth chakra (called Ajna), which is said to include the third eye. This chakra is believed to be related to intuition and gnosis (spiritual knowledge).
- Alice A. Bailey used indigo as the "second ray", representing "Love-Wisdom", in her Seven Rays system classifying people into seven metaphysical psychological types.
- Psychics often associate indigo paranormal auras with an interest in religion or with intense spirituality and intuition. Indigo children are said to have predominantly indigo auras. People with indigo auras are said to favor occupations such as computer analyst, animal caretaker, and counselor.
- In Wicca, it represents emotion, fluidity, insight, and expressiveness. It is used to spiritually heal.

== See also ==
- Baptisia (false indigo), a genus of flowering plants
- Indigo dye, used in dyeing blue jeans their characteristic color
- Indigofera, a genus of flowering plants
- Lists of colors
- Persicaria tinctoria, Japanese Indigo
- Red, White, and Black Make Blue: Indigo in the Fabric of Colonial South Carolina Life by Andrea Feeser
