= Computer analyst =

Computer analyst may refer to:

- Programmer
- Programmer analyst
- Software analyst
- Business analyst
- Systems analyst
- Application analyst
