= Software analyst =

Profession in IT

In a software development team, a software analyst is the person who monitors the software development process, performs configuration management, identifies safety, performance, and compliance issues, and prepares software requirements and specification (Software Requirements Specification) documents. The software analyst is the seam between the software users and the software developers. They convey the demands of software users to the developers.

== See also ==
- Systems analyst
- Application analyst
