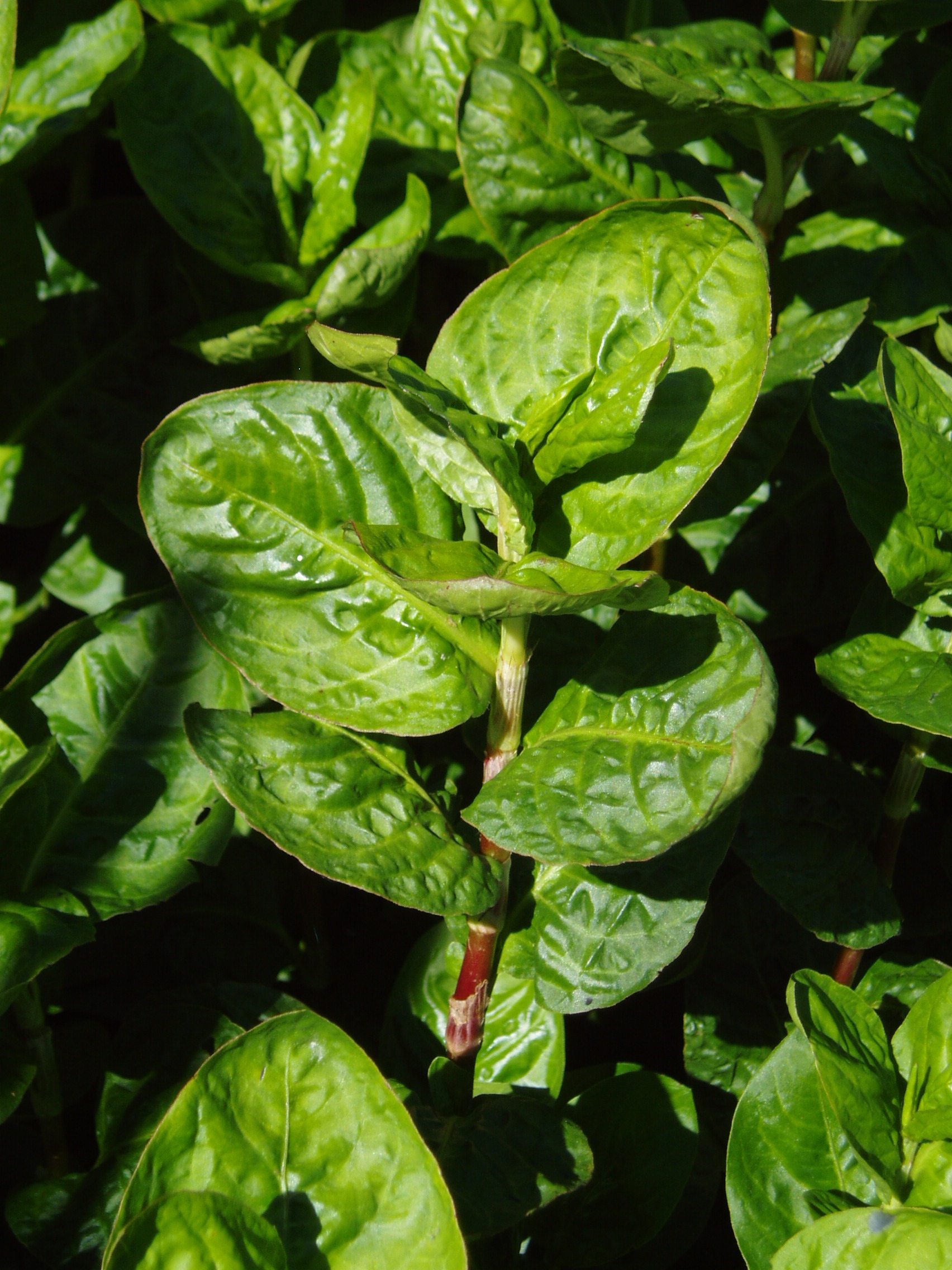

Scientific classification
- Kingdom: Plantae
- Clade: Embryophytes
- Clade: Tracheophytes
- Clade: Spermatophytes
- Clade: Angiosperms
- Clade: Eudicots
- Order: Caryophyllales
- Family: Polygonaceae
- Genus: Persicaria
- Species: P. tinctoria

Binomial name
- Persicaria tinctoria (Aiton) Spach 1841

Synonyms
- Polygonum tinctorium Aiton 1789; Ampelygonum tinctorium (Aiton) Steud.; Persicaria tinctoria (Aiton) H. Gross; Pogalis tinctoria (Aiton) Raf.

= Persicaria tinctoria =

Species of plant

Persicaria tinctoria is a species of flowering plant in the buckwheat family. Common names include Chinese indigo, Japanese indigo and dyer's knotweed. It is native to Southern China and Vietnam, and has been introduced to other parts of China, as well as Germany, Japan, Korea, Tibet, North and South Caucasus, parts of the Russian Far-East, and Ukraine.

The leaves are a source of indigo dye. It was already in use in the Western Zhou period (c. 1045 BC – 771 BC), and was the most important blue dye in East Asia until the arrival of Indigofera from the south.

== Gallery ==
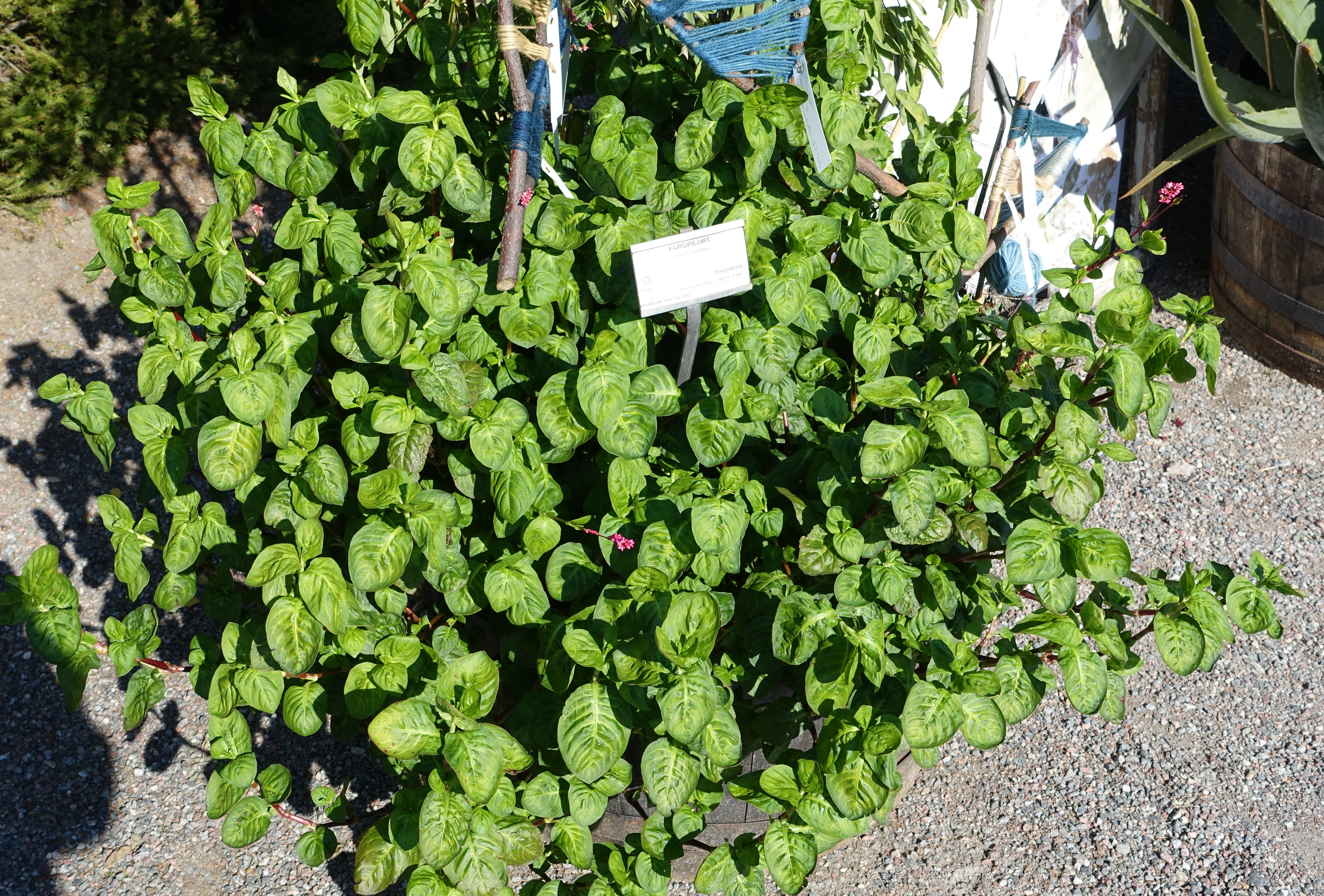
In Stockholm, Sweden

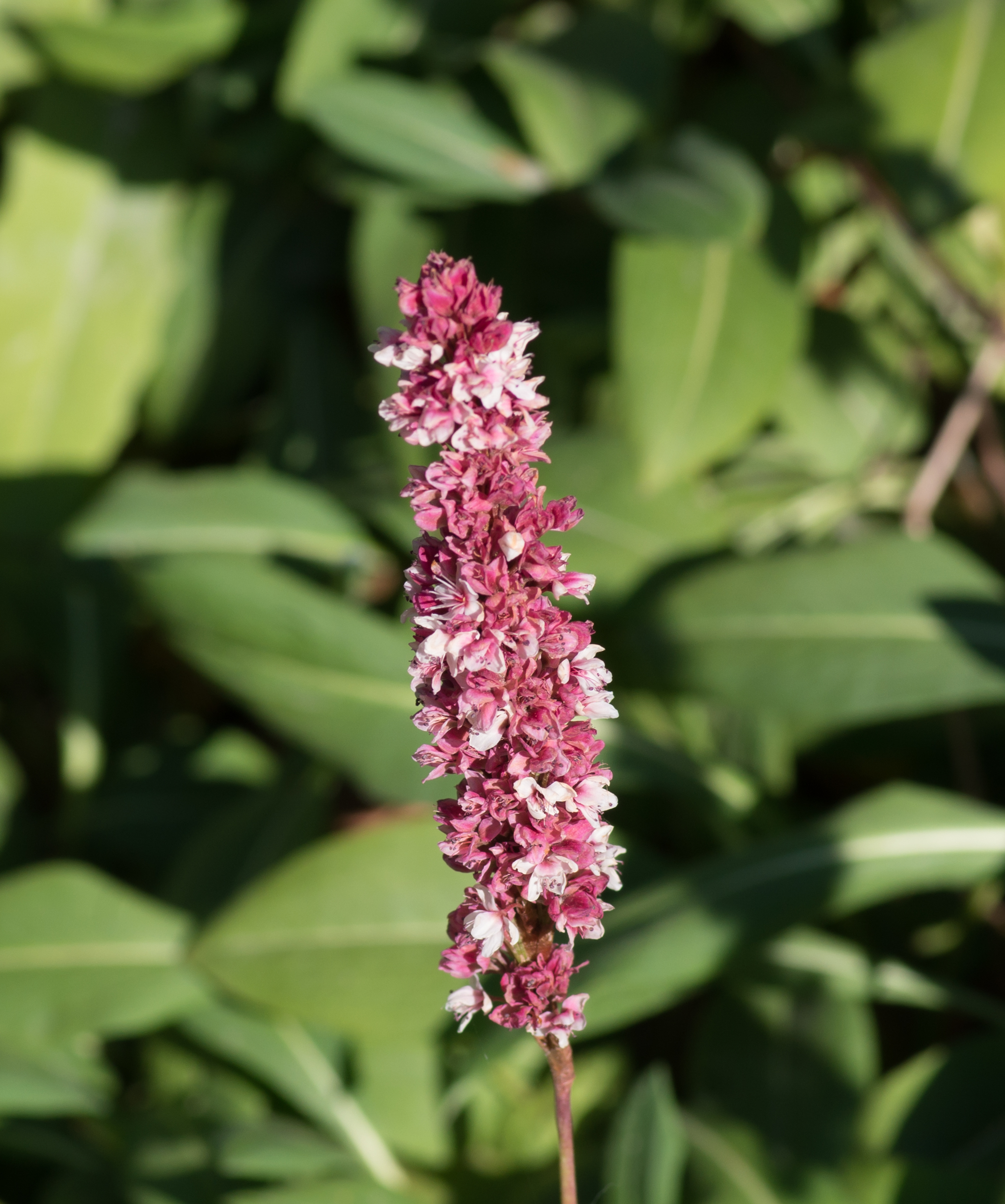
Close up of the flower

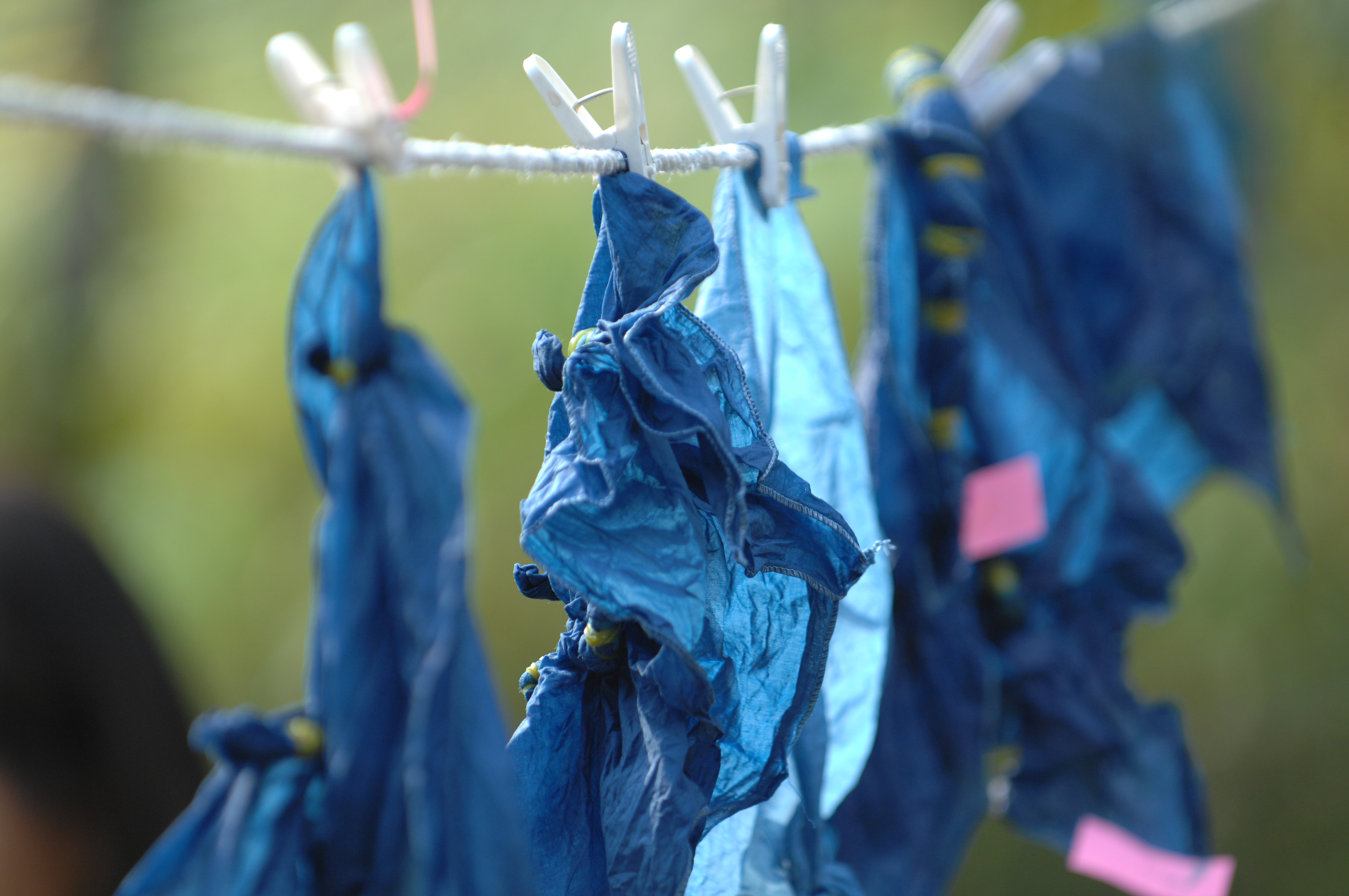
Traditional natural dyeing (Korean blue)

== See also ==
- Indigofera tinctoria
