= Systems analyst =

Type of IT professional

A systems analyst, also known as business technology analyst, is an information technology (IT) professional who specializes in analyzing, designing and implementing information systems. Systems analysts assess the suitability of information systems in terms of their intended outcomes and liaise with end users, software vendors and programmers in order to achieve these outcomes. A systems analyst is a person who uses analysis and design techniques to solve business problems using information technology. Systems analysts may serve as change agents who identify the organizational improvements needed, design systems to implement those changes, and train and motivate others to use the systems.

== Industry ==
As of 2015, the sectors employing the greatest numbers of computer systems analysts were state government, insurance, computer system design, professional and commercial equipment, and company and enterprise management. The number of jobs in this field is projected to grow from 487,000 as of 2009 to 650,000 by 2016. According to the U.S. Bureau of Labor Statistics (BLS), Occupational Outlook predicts the need for Computer Systems Analysts as growing 25% in 2012 to 2022 and gradually decreasing their estimates and now predict the years 2024 to 2034 as only a growth of 9%, saying: "Many of those openings are expected to result from the need to replace workers who transfer to different occupations or exit the labor force, such as to retire."

The Wall Street Journal reported that job site CareerCast.com ranked systems analyst as the third-best job in a 2010 survey, fifth-best in the 2011 survey, 9th-best in the 2012 survey, and the 10th-best in the 2013 survey.

== See also ==
- Business analyst
- Change management analyst
- Data analyst
- Software analyst
