= List of countries by public sector size =

This is a list of countries by public sector size, calculated as the number of public sector employees as a percentage of the total workforce. Information is based mainly on data from the OECD and the ILO. If a source has figures for more than one year, only the most recent figure is used (with notes for exceptional circumstances).

In the former Eastern Bloc countries, the public sector in 1989 accounted for between 70% and over 90% of total employment. In China a full 78.3% of the urban labor force were employed in the public sector by 1978, the year the reform and opening up was launched, after which the rates dropped. Jin Zeng estimates the numbers were 56.4% in 1995 and 32.8% in 2003, while other estimates are higher. In 2021, public sector employees made up an estimated 23% of employees in China.

In OECD countries, the average public sector employment rate was 21.3% in 2013.

== List ==
Country	ILO (%)	Other estimates (%)
Afghanistan	8.3 (2021)	
Angola	7.12 (2025)	
Antigua and Barbuda	29 (2018)	
Albania	15.13 (2024)	
American Samoa	25.0 (2012)	
Argentina	17.2 (2024)	
Armenia	18 (2023)	19.3 (2020)
Australia	28.9 (2021)	20.4 (2012)
Austria	20 (2022)	15.2 (2014)
Azerbaijan	21.9 (2022)	21.7 (World Bank publication, 2009)
Bahamas	15.9 (2023)	
Bangladesh	3.1 (2017)	
Bahrain	9.6 (2012)	8.4* (Note: GCC estimates by Baldwin-Edwards are state employment as a proportion of total employment. The employment of nationals is primarily in the state sector, with migrant workers dominating the private sector.) (Baldwin-Edwards, 2010)
Barbados	17.1 (2019)	
Belarus	39.3 (2015)	72.0 (World Bank publication, 2010), 40.1 (BelStat, 2017)
Belgium	21.1 (2019)	21.5 (2013)
Bermuda	12.1 (2012)	
Bhutan	25.0 (2022)	
Bolivia	7.7 (2022)	
Bosnia and Herzegovina	24.5 (2022)	
Botswana	18.0 (2022)	
Brazil	12.4 (2025)	12.1 (2013)
Bulgaria	21.1 (2019)	
Burkina Faso	3.42 (2024)	
Burundi	2.9 (2020)	
Cameroon	0.15 (2021)	
Canada	21.6 (2025)	22.4 (2013)
Chile	9.6 (2025)	14.0 (2013)
China	28.0 (2012)	
Colombia	4.2 (2022)	5.3* (Note: The number of employees in Colombia's public sector is underestimated because subcontracting and outsourcing are common in many government agencies.) (2017, Public Spending and Investment Commission), 6.8 (2017, Colombian Insurers Federation); 10.0 (2013)
Costa Rica	12.4 (2022)	
Croatia	29.8 (2020)	
Czech Republic	15.4 (2015)	18.0 (2013)
Cuba	77.6 (2012)	72.0 (2014, Third World Quarterly) 72.8 (2018, Statistical Yearbook of Cuba) 65.0 (2022, OIEI)
Denmark	30.2 (2020)	32.9 (2011)
Dominican Republic	13.8 (2022)	
Ecuador	7.0 (2022)	
Egypt	21.2 (2020)	
El Salvador	8.1 (2022)	
Estonia	23.8 (2019)	22.0 (2013)
Ethiopia	6.6 (2021)	
Finland	24.9 (2020)	27.0 (2013)
France	20.1 (2024)	28.0 (2013)
Gambia	8.0 (2023)	
Georgia	17.8 (2024)	21.1 (World Bank publication, 2009)
Ghana	5.5 (2024)	
Germany	12.9 (2013)	15.3 (2012)
Greece	22.2 (2020)	14.6 (2012)
Greenland	40.2 (2015)	
Guatemala	6.1 (2022)	
Guinea	6.8 (2018)	
Haiti	9.0 (2012)	
Hong Kong	7.1 (2014)	
Hungary	30.4 (2018)	24.8 (2012)
Iceland		24.95 (2019)
India	3.80 (2014)	4.7* (Note: India's public sector still accounted for 69% of the country's organised workforce.) (2002); 3.80 (World Bank Data and Reserve; Bank of India Data, 2012)
Indonesia	8.7 (2022)	
Iran	14.9 (2020)	
Iraq	37.4 (2021)	
Ireland	21.9 (2019)	19.5 (2014)
Israel	31.4 (2021)	20.7 (2007)
Italy	16.0 (2013)	18.3 (2013)
Japan	7.7 (2019)	12.9 (2014)
Jordan	24.3 (2019)	
Kazakhstan	23.3 (2012)	20.8 (World Bank publication, 2009)
Kosovo	27.8 (2020)	20.8 (World Bank publication, 2009)
Kuwait	18.6 (2016)	18.5* (Baldwin-Edwards, 2008)
Kyrgyzstan	17.0 (2021)	15.1 (World Bank publication, 2009)
Laos	11.4 (2017)	
Latvia	29.0 (2020)	31.2 (2013)
Liberia	40.3 (2017)	
Liechtenstein	7.1 (2015)	
Lithuania	26.9 (2019)	24.0 (World Bank publication, 2010)
Luxembourg	11.7 (2018)	22.1 (2011)
Macau	6.5 (2014)	
Madagascar	3.25 (2022)	
Malaysia	15.1 (2019)	
Mali	2.38 (2020)	
Mauritius	18.1 (2019)	
Mexico	11.8 (2022)	13.8 (2013)
Moldova	16.2 (2022)	41.0 (World Bank publication, 2010)
Mongolia	36.6 (2022)	
Montenegro		32.2 (2021)
Morocco	8.4 (2022)	
New Zealand	18.9 (2025)	
Nicaragua	8.1 (2012)	
Nigeria	3.6 (2022)	
Netherlands	19.9 (2019)	17.3 (2013)
North Macedonia	25.6 (2022)	
Norway	32.2 (2020)	35.6 (2013)
OECD		21.3* (Note: OECD average for 2013 does not include Australia, the Czech Republic, Germany, South Korea, Ireland and Portugal.) (2013)
Oman	16.2 (2022)	14.0* (Baldwin-Edwards, 2008)
Pakistan	7.3 (2021)	
Palestine	20.9 (2022)	
Panama	16.1 (2022)	
Paraguay	10.5 (2022)	
Peru	8.2 (2022)	
Philippines	9.1 (2019)	
Poland	23.6 (2019)	16.0 (World Bank publication, 2010); 25.2 (2013)
Portugal	14.7 (2018)	18.4 (2014)
Qatar	11.3 (2022)	12.1* (Baldwin-Edwards, 2009)
Romania	16.0 (2019)	15.3 (INS, 2015)
Russia	40.6 (2011)	31.0 (2016, IMF)
Rwanda	5.6 (2022)	
Saint Lucia	17.6 (2022)	
San Marino	23.4 (2022)	
Saudi Arabia	35.3 (???)	35.3* (Baldwin-Edwards, 2008)
Senegal	6.3 (2019)	
Serbia	23.3 (2022)	
Seychelles	44.3 (2020)	
Singapore	9.9 (2022)	
Slovakia	28.0 (2022)	18.2 (2013)
Slovenia	23 (2019)	20.9 (2012)
South Africa	15.7 (2022)	17.4 (2013)
South Korea	10.7 (2019)	11.6 (2013)
Spain	16.3 (2019)	17.9 (2014)
Sri Lanka	14.8 (2019)	
Sweden	29.3 (2020)	29.9 (2013)
Switzerland	15.3 (2022)	18.0 (2014)
Tajikistan		33.0 (World Bank publication, 2010)
Tanzania	4.6 (2020)	
Thailand	9.6 (2022)	
Trinidad and Tobago	22.9 (2021)	
Turkey	15.0 (2022)	15.9 (2011)
Uganda	4.1 (2017)	
Ukraine	26.5 (2013)	26.7 (2012)
United Arab Emirates	7.11 (2024)	
United Kingdom	23.9 (2025)	16.7 (House of Commons Library, 2020); 21.5 (2013)
United States	13.4 (2025)	19.2 (Mercatus publication, 2013); 17.6 [not included in dataset] (2013)
Uruguay	15.7 (2022)	
Uzbekistan	18.2 (2019)	
Venezuela	24.3 (2020)	
Vietnam	7.6 (2022)	
Yemen	19.3 (2014)	
Zambia	6.7 (2019)	
Zimbabwe	12.1 (2019)	

== See also ==
- List of countries by employment rate
- List of countries by government spending as percentage of GDP
- List of countries by labour force
- Public sector
