= Application analyst =

Whose job is to support a given software application

An application analyst (also applications systems analyst) is someone whose job is to support a given application or applications. This may entail some computer programming, some system administration skills, and the ability to analyze a given problem, diagnose it and find its root cause, and then either solve it or pass the problem on to the relevant people if it does not lie within the application analyst's area of responsibility. Typically an application analyst will be responsible for supporting bespoke (i.e. custom) applications programmed with a variety of programming languages and using a variety of database systems, middleware systems and the like. It is a form of 3rd level technical support/help desk. The role may or may not involve some customer contact but most often it involves getting some description of the problem from help desk, making a diagnosis and then either creating a fix or passing the problem on to someone who is responsible for the actual problem area.

In some companies, an application analyst is a software architect.

== Overview ==
Depending on the Industry, an application analyst will apply subject matter expertise by verifying design documents, execute testing for new functionality, and defect fixes. Additional responsibilities can include being a liaison between business stakeholders and IT developers. Also, providing clarifications on system requirements and design for integrating-application teams. An application analyst will interface with multiple channels (depending on scope) to provide demos and application walk-throughs and training. An application analyst will align with IT resources to ensure high quality deliverables utilizing agile methodology for rapid delivery technology enablers. Participating in the change request management process to field, document, and communicate responses feedback is also common within an application analyst's responsibilities.

Application systems analysts consult with management and help develop software to fit clients' needs. Application systems analyst must provide accurate, quality analyses of new program applications, as well as conduct testing, locate potential problems, and solve them in an efficient manner. Clients' needs may vary widely (for example, they may work in the medical field or in the securities industry), and staying up to date with software and technology trends in their field are essential.

Companies that require analysts are mostly in the fields of business, accounting, security, and scientific engineering. Application systems analysts work with other analysts and program designers, as well as managers and clients. These analysts generally work in an office setting, but there are exceptions when clients may need services at their office or home. Application systems analysts usually work full time, although they may need to work nights and weekends to resolve emerging issues or when deadlines approach; some companies may require analysts to be on call.

Analyst positions typically require at least a bachelor's degree in computer science or a related field, and a master's degree may be required. Previous information technology experience - preferably in a similar role - is required as well. Application systems analysts must have excellent communication skills, as they often work directly with clients and may be required to train other analysts. Flexibility, the ability to work well in teams, and the ability to work well with minimal supervision are also preferred traits.

Application analyst tasks include:

- Analyze and route issues into the proper ticketing systems and update and close tickets in a timely manner.
- Devise or modify procedures to solve problems considering computer equipment capacity and limitations.
- Establish new users, manage access levels and reset passwords.
- Conduct application testing and provide database management support.
- Create and maintain documentation as necessary for operational and security audits.
