= Public sector =

Public part of the economy

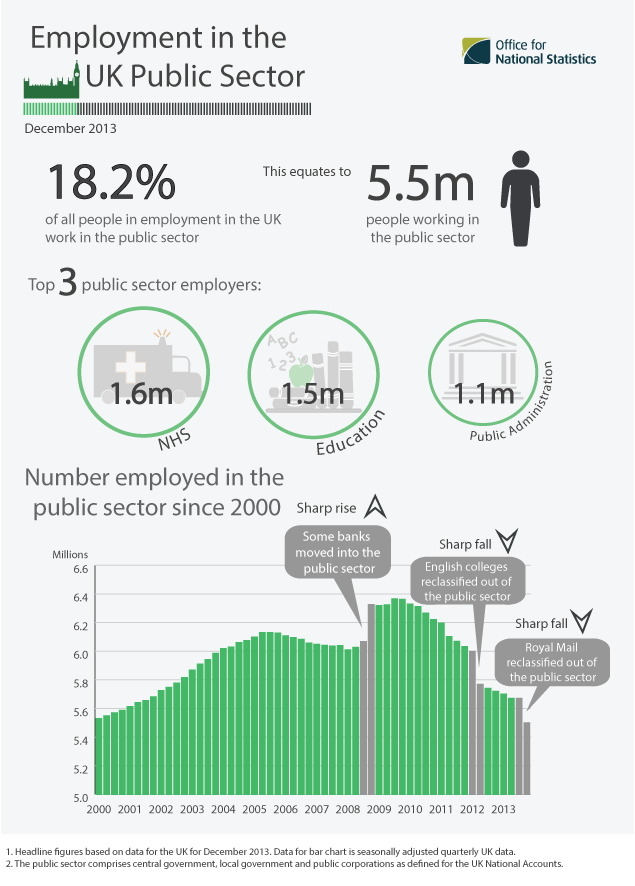
Employment in the UK Public Sector, December 2013

The public sector, also called the state sector, is the part of the economy composed of both public services and public enterprises. Public sectors include the public goods and governmental services such as the military, law enforcement, public infrastructure, public transit, public education, along with public health care and those working for the government itself, such as elected officials. The public sector might provide services that a non-payer cannot be excluded from (such as street lighting), services which benefit all of society rather than just the individual who uses the service. Public enterprises, or state-owned enterprises, are self-financing commercial enterprises that are under public ownership which provide various private goods and services for sale and usually operate on a commercial basis.

Organizations that are not part of the public sector are either part of the private sector or voluntary sector. The private sector is composed of the economic sectors that are intended to earn a profit for the owners of the enterprise. The voluntary, civic, or social sector concerns a diverse array of non-profit organizations emphasizing civil society. In the United Kingdom, the term "wider public sector" is often used, referring to public sector organizations outside central government.

== Organization ==
The organization of the public sector can take several forms, including:

- Direct administration funded through taxation; the delivering organization generally has no specific requirement to meet commercial success criteria, and production decisions are determined by government.
- State-owned enterprises; which differ from direct administration in that they have greater management autonomy and operate according to commercial criteria, and production decisions are not generally taken by a government (although goals may be set for them by the government).
- The public sector in many countries is organized at three levels: Federal or National, Regional (State or Provincial), and Local (Municipal or County).
- Partial outsourcing (of the scale many businesses do, e.g. for IT services) is considered a public sector model.

A borderline form is as follows:

- Complete outsourcing or contracting out, with a privately owned corporation delivering the entire service on behalf of the government. This may be considered a mixture of private sector operations with public ownership of assets, although in some forms the private sector's control and/or risk is so great that the service may no longer be considered part of the public sector (Barlow et al., 2010). (See the United Kingdom's Private Finance Initiative.)
- Public employee unions represent workers. Since contract negotiations for these workers are dependent on the size of government budgets, this is the one segment of the labor movement that can actually contribute directly to the people with ultimate responsibility for its livelihood. While their giving pattern matches that of other unions, public sector unions also concentrate contributions on members of Congress from both parties who sit on committees that deal with federal budgets and agencies.

== Infrastructure ==
Infrastructure includes areas that support both the public's members and the public sector itself. Streets and highways are used both by those who work for the public sector and also by the citizenry. The former, who are public employees, are also part of the citizenry.

Public roads, bridges, tunnels, water supply, sewers, electrical grids and telecommunications networks are among the public infrastructure.

== Public sector staff ==
Rates of pay for public sector staff may be negotiated by employers and their staff or staff representatives such as trade unions. In some cases, for example in the United Kingdom, a pay review body is charged with making independent recommendations on rates of pay for groups of public sector staff.

=== By country ===
==== France ====
As of 2017, France had 5.6 million civil servants, amounting to 20% of all jobs in France. They are subdivided into three types: the State civil service (Fonction publique d'État, FPE) includes teachers and soldiers, and employs 44% of the workforce. The local civil service (Fonction publique territoriale; FPT) is made up of employees of town halls and regional councils: 25% of the workforce. The hospital civil service (Fonction publique hospitalière, FPH) consists of doctors and nurses and is 21% of the workforce.

==== United Kingdom ====
The Immigration Act 2016 states that staff in public facing roles within the public sector must be sufficiently fluent in the English language (or the Welsh language, in Wales) to ensure that they can communicate effectively with people accessing public services. A Code of Practice on this requirement was issued in 2016 after the legislation was passed.

== Criticism ==
Right-libertarian and Austrian School economists have criticized the idea of public sector provision of goods and services as inherently inefficient. In 1961, Murray Rothbard wrote: "Any reduction of the public sector, any shift of activities from the public to the private sphere, is a net moral and economic gain."

American libertarians and anarcho-capitalists have also argued that the system by which the public sector is funded, namely taxation, is itself coercive and unjust. However, some small-government proponents have pushed back on this point of view, citing the ultimate necessity of a public sector for provision of certain services, such as national defense, public works and utilities, and pollution controls.

== See also ==
- Civil service
- Government agency
- List of countries by government spending as percentage of GDP
- List of countries by public sector
- Nationalization
- Privatization
- Private sector
- Public ownership
- Public–private partnership
- Public sector business cases for projects
- Special-purpose district
- State-owned enterprise
