= Change management analyst =

According to the National Weather Service (USA), the position of a change management analyst was described in 2006 as:

The [change management analyst's] responsibilities include: analyzing the (request for change) prior to distributing it for review processing, obtaining all missing data, scheduling and providing secretarial assistance (agendas and minutes) to the [configuration control board] and (program management committee) meetings, maintaining the current status of (request for changes) including action items, maintaining charters and Terms of Reference (TOR), and coordinating the (request for change) appeals process.
